= Aston Park, Dallas =

Public park in Texas, United States

Aston Park
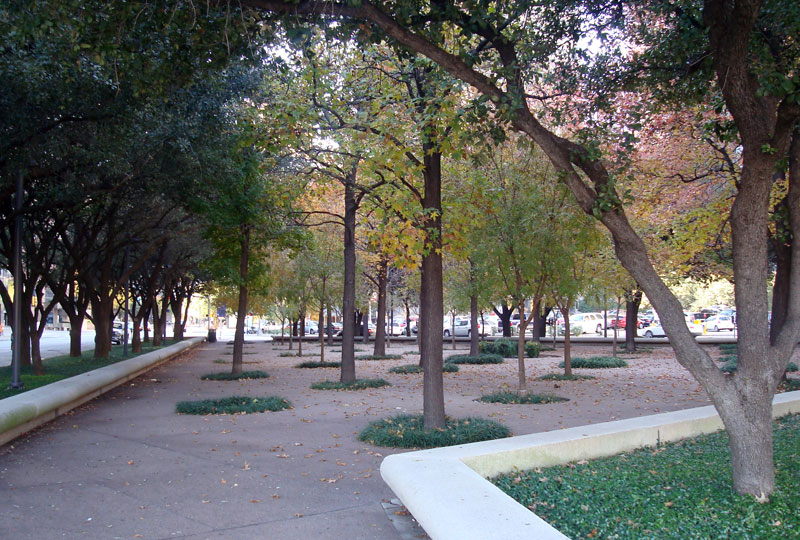
- Aston Park in 2009.
- Interactive map of Aston Park
- Type: public park
- Location: Dallas, Texas
- Coordinates: 32°47′00″N 96°47′44″W
- Created: 1983
- Operator: City of Dallas
- Open: All year

Aston Park is a public park located in downtown Dallas, Texas, United States. The park is located on a triangle of land located between Pacific, Harwood and Live Oak in the City Center District.

== History ==
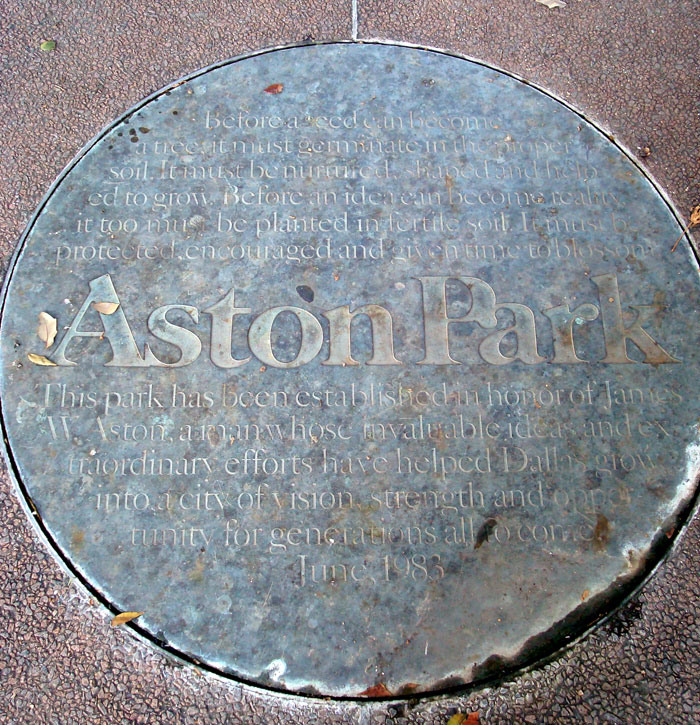
Medallion at the entrance to Aston Park

The park was dedicated in 1983 in honor of James W. Aston, who was a prominent business leader and president of Republic National Bank in 1957.

Adjacent to Republic Center, Corrigan Tower and Pacific Place, the park consists of a grove of mature trees and plaza area. As currently designed it receives little use because of its isolation from downtown activity centers. Future plans will incorporate Aston Park into the larger Pacific Plaza Park across Live Oak.
