= One Dallas Center =

Skyscraper in Dallas Texas

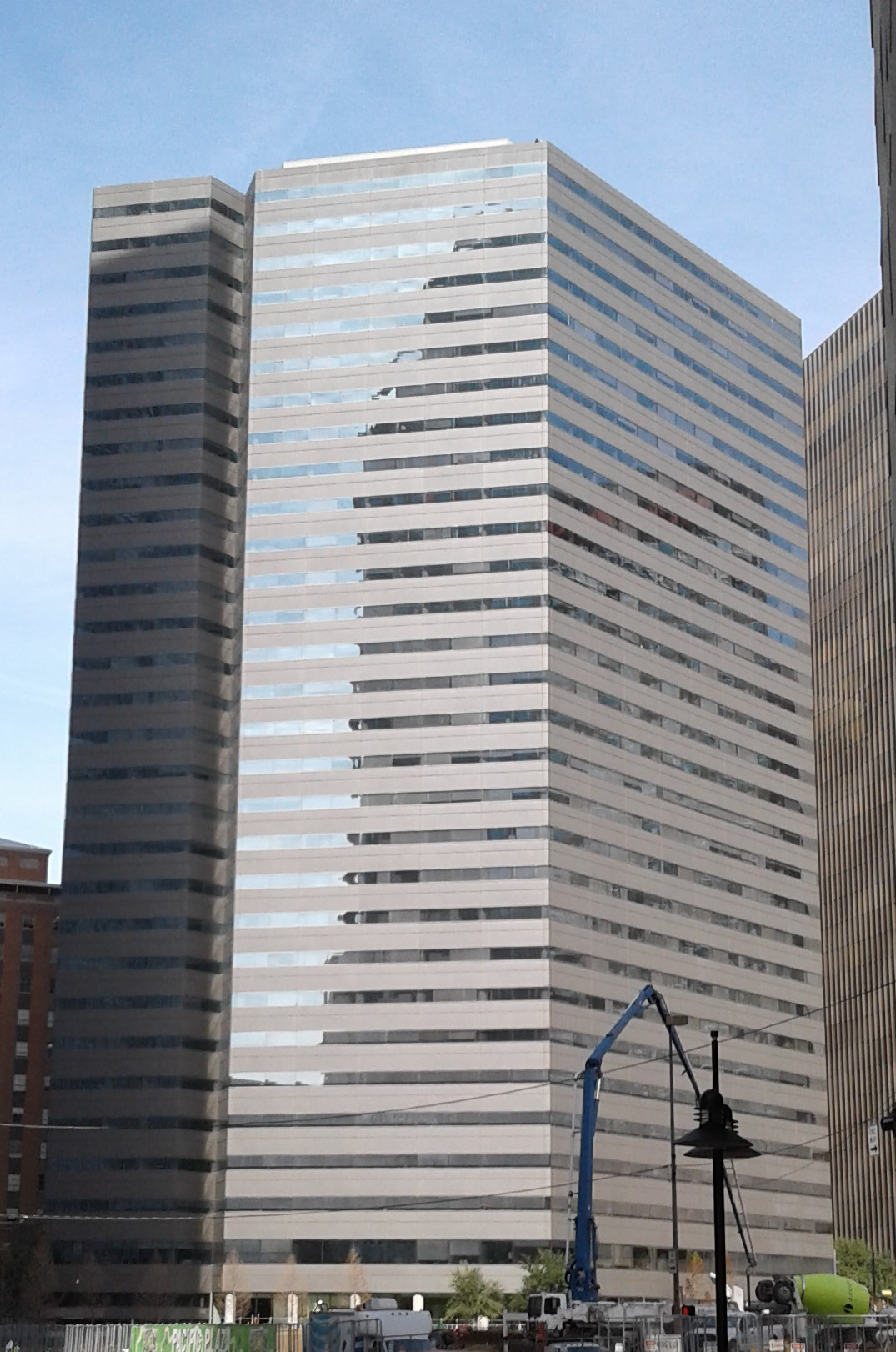
- The One Dallas Center building in 2018
- Interactive map of the One Dallas Center area

General information
- Type: office & luxury apartment community
- Location: 350 North Saint Paul Street, Dallas, Texas, United States
- Coordinates: 32°47′03″N 96°47′49″W
- Completed: 1979

Height
- Roof: 448 ft (137 m)
- Top floor: 439 ft (134 m)

Technical details
- Floor count: 30
- Floor area: 615,000 sq ft (57,100 m^{2})

Design and construction
- Architect: I.M. Pei & Partners
- Developer: Carrozza Investments Ltd.

Website
- www.1dallascenterapartments.com/one-dallas-center-dallas-tx-1/

One Dallas Center (formerly Patriot Tower) is a modernist skyscraper located in the City Center District of downtown Dallas, Texas, completed in 1979. The building has 30 floors and rises 448 feet (137 meters). One Dallas Center is currently tied with the Sheraton Dallas Hotel North Tower as the 25th-tallest building in the city. The building was originally planned as part of a three-building complex designed by I.M. Pei & Partners, but only one tower was constructed.

One Dallas Center is now owned by Todd Interests and houses the headquarters of HKS Inc., Greyhound, and Apex Clearing Corporation. The first 15 floors of the high rise are renovated office space, while the top 15 floors are luxury apartment homes constructed and delivered in October 2014. One Dallas Center is professionally managed by Lincoln Property Company.

== History ==
One Dallas Center (originally styled One Dallas Centre) was announced by developer Vince Carrozza in 1977 as the first phase of a US$200 million mixed-use development. Phase One included One Dallas Center and the 500-space parking garage across Bryan Street. Two Dallas Center, adjacent to the south of One Dallas Center, was to include a 21-story, 500 room hotel above 30 floors of office space. The third phase would have consisted of a 400-unit luxury apartment complex across Harwood Street, on land now occupied by the Sheraton Dallas Hotel convention facility. All parts were to be connected by the expanded Dallas Pedestrian Network (Vincent Ponte, land planner for Dallas Center, was also a city planning consultant for the pedestrian network). During construction on October 11, 1978, a crane fell 27 stories from the roof and crashed to the ground, killing a worker, injuring others, and punching several holes in the side of the tower.

One Dallas Center opened in 1979, but additional phases of the development were never completed due to various leasehold issues attached to the land (although the building was connected to the Dallas Pedestrian Network). In 1985 the building was purchased by Trammell Crow, who owned a large share of adjacent office space at the time. It changed ownership again during the 1990s as nearby development made the building more attractive; adjacent Bryan Street was closed to auto traffic for DART's St. Paul Station, which opened in 1996. In 2007 Younan Properties Inc. purchased the building and changed the name to Patriot Tower. The company planned a $10 million renovation and addition of a war memorial museum in the building's lobby.

In 2012 the building sold to new owners, Todd Interests, who converted the upper 17 floors into apartments and renovated the lower levels.

Street sign announcing the construction and leasing information of the tower was shown in opening scene of season 1 episode 3 of Dallas in 1978.

== Design ==
One Dallas Center was designed by architect Henry N. Cobb of I.M. Pei & Partners to play with the site rather than fill the entire block. The building's diamond shape relates to the geometry of the city's diagonally intersecting street grids, specifically where nearby Live Oak Street intersects downtown's grid at a 30-degree angle. Placement of the building was carefully considered to relate to nearby structures and provide green space around building entrances. The two triangular notches on the sides of One Dallas Center create added interest and provide four additional corner offices on each floor. The exterior of the building was designed with two-thirds of the facade covered in aluminum instead of highly-reflective glass. This helped conserve energy while also complementing the style of the adjacent Republic Center. 2-inch projections of stainless steel separate the glass from the aluminum. One Design Center has an extensive permanent collection of art which includes works by Dallas-based artist, JD Miller.

The original 1977 plan had all phases designed by Henry Cobb and the shapes were eccentric but cohesive. Two Dallas Centre was to be a chevron-shaped tower with 30 floors of office space topped with 21 floors of hotel space, also integrating unique angles. Three Dallas Centre was envisioned to contain 400 luxury apartments across the street.

In 1981 the master site plan was revised and Two Dallas Centre was redesigned by architect Araldo Cossutta. It included one 1.7 million-square-foot office building (twin hexagonal towers joined at the 16th and 23rd floors) and a separate 500-room hotel with semi-circular windows on four sides.

== Gallery ==
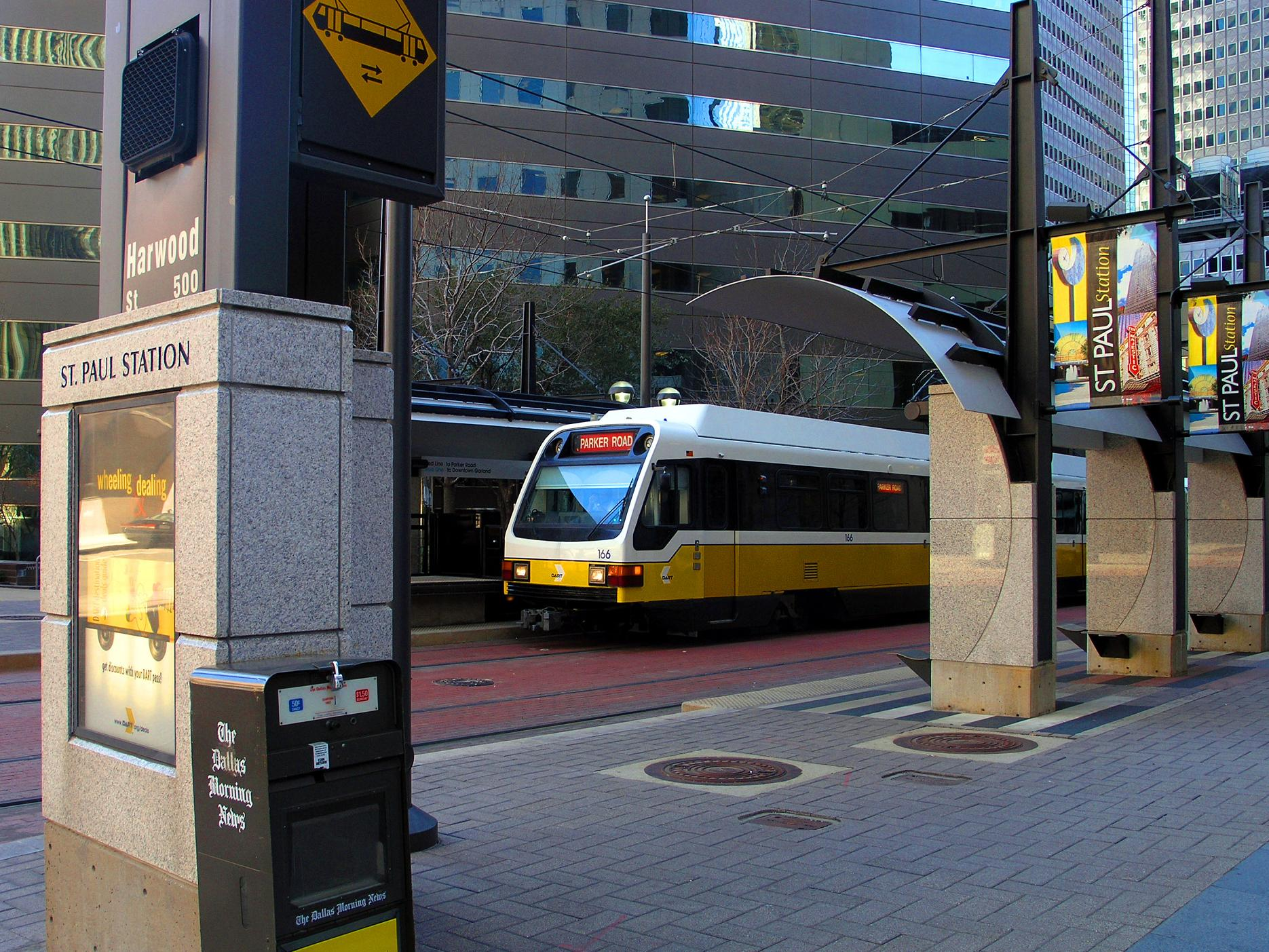
DART's St. Paul Station with One Dallas Center in the background

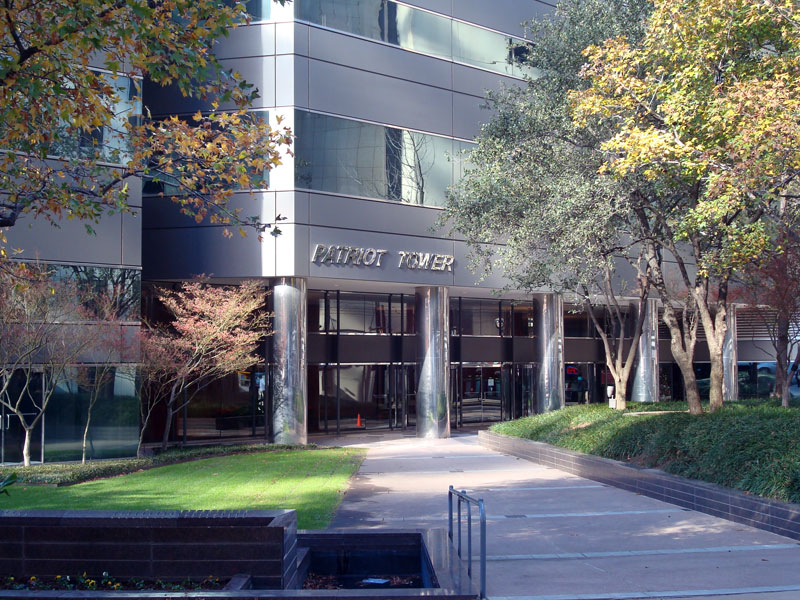
Entrance into the building, when it was signed as Patriot Tower

== See also ==
- List of tallest buildings and structures in Dallas
