= Fred F. Florence =

American banker and civic leader (1891–1960)

- Born: Fred Farrel Fromowitz; November 5, 1891; New York City, U.S.
- Died: December 25, 1960 (aged 69); Dallas, Texas, U.S.
- Occupation: Banker
- Known for: President of Republic National Bank of Dallas; president of the American Bankers Association
- Spouse: Helen Lefkowitz (m. 1928)
- Children: 2 (adopted)
- Relatives: David Lefkowitz (father-in-law)

Fred Farrel Florence (November 5, 1891 – December 25, 1960) was an American banker and civic leader in Dallas, Texas. As president of the Republic National Bank of Dallas from 1929 to 1957, he guided it through the Great Depression and built it into the largest bank in the South, with deposits growing from roughly $1 million to nearly $900 million. He was president of the American Bankers Association in 1955 and, by the historian Darwin Payne's assessment, the Dallas figure whose backing mattered most to any civic undertaking of his era.

== Early life ==
Florence was born in New York City to Mose and Celia (Freedman) Fromowitz, Jewish immigrants from Lithuania. The family relocated to New Birmingham, Texas, in 1892 and to Rusk around 1894, where his father kept a store. He went to public school through the tenth grade while working in the store and selling newspapers, and never attended college. He and his siblings later legally took the surname Florence.

== Banking career ==
=== East Texas ===
Florence started at the First National Bank of Rusk as a teenager, initially sweeping floors, and had risen to assistant cashier by 1911. That year he became a bookkeeper at the American Exchange Bank in Dallas, followed by a post as cashier of the First State Bank in Ratcliff in 1912. He joined the Alto State Bank in Alto as vice president the same year and became its president in 1915.

In 1918 he enlisted as a corporal in the Signal Corps Aviation School of the United States Army, leaving the service that year as a second lieutenant. Back in Alto, he resumed the bank presidency, sat as a town alderman, and was elected mayor in 1919.

=== Republic National Bank ===
Florence moved to Dallas in 1920 as first vice president of the newly founded Guaranty Bank and Trust Company. The bank was renamed Republic National Bank and Trust Company in 1922 and Republic National Bank of Dallas in 1937. He became president in 1929, at 37, and held the office until 1957, when he took the chairmanship of the executive committee while continuing as chief executive. He was succeeded as president by James W. Aston.

Taking charge in the year of the stock market crash, Florence brought the bank through the Depression; by 1950 it was the largest bank in the South. He paired conservative management with an insistence that bankers seek out business rather than wait for it. He was an early leader in commodity lending, particularly against cotton and oil. Republic was among the first Texas banks to lend against oil reserves and natural gas production, and its growth reduced the state's reliance on Northern lenders.

Florence was the driving force behind the bank's new headquarters, the Republic National Bank Building, announced in June 1950. Its architects, Harrison & Abramovitz, were chosen by board chairman Karl Hoblitzelle rather than by Florence. Florence worked the steam shovel himself at the groundbreaking on November 30, 1950. The aluminum-clad tower opened at the end of 1954 as the tallest building in the Southwest, at a final cost of $25 million.

Outside Republic, he sat on the boards of numerous companies, including Lone Star Steel (which he also chaired), Bond Stores, Wyatt Industries, the Missouri–Kansas–Texas Railroad, Dallas Power & Light, the Austin Bridge Company, the Hotel Baker, Sanger Brothers, and Neiman Marcus, and was a vice president of the Dallas Joint Stock Land Bank.

Within the American Bankers Association, he served on its National Defense and War Loan committee from 1941 to 1944 and chaired its Credit Policy Commission from 1951 to 1954, before being elected vice president in 1954 and president in 1955. He was president of the Texas Bankers Association in 1956.

== Public and civic life ==
Florence became Dallas's city treasurer in 1931 and helped steer the city's finances through the Depression. He was also appointed to recovery and relief boards by Texas governors Ross S. Sterling and Miriam A. Ferguson and by President Franklin D. Roosevelt. He played a central part in winning the Texas Centennial Exposition for Dallas and served as its president in 1936, then as president of the Greater Texas & Pan-American Exposition in 1937.

His civic roles in Dallas included the board of the State Fair of Texas, the Dallas Citizens Council, the Chamber of Commerce, and the city's arts, music, and historical bodies. In education and research, he served on executive committees at Southern Methodist University and the Southwestern Medical Foundation; on the boards of the National Merit Scholarship Corporation and the Southwest Research Institute; and as a trustee of Hebrew Union College and St. Mark's School of Texas.

Florence was active in the Dallas Jewish community, in which his father-in-law, Rabbi David Lefkowitz, was the leading rabbi at Temple Emanu-El. Florence was a director of the temple, led the Jewish Federation for Social Service, chaired the United Palestine Fund for Dallas and Texas in 1924, and was national chairman of the Combined Campaign for American Reform Judaism in 1960–61. Where the city's other prominent Jewish businessmen came largely from retail, Florence was unusual in rising to the top of the city's banking establishment.

His charitable work also extended to the March of Dimes, the American Cancer Society, Camp Fire Girls, and the Boy Scouts of America, and he chaired the building campaign for St. Paul Hospital in Dallas. In 1956 President Dwight D. Eisenhower made him chairman of the banking committee of the People to People program. That December he founded the Florence Foundation to fund charitable, religious, educational, and scientific work.

== Honors ==
- Linz Award for civic service to Dallas (1944)
- Headliner of the Year, Dallas Press Club (1956)
- Benemerenti medal (1959), for his work on the St. Paul Hospital campaign
- Distinguished Civic Service Award, Greater Dallas Planning Council (1960)
- Honorary doctorates from Westminster College (1955), Oklahoma City University (1956), and Texas Technological College, now Texas Tech University (1960)

== Personal life and death ==
Florence married Helen Lefkowitz on February 21, 1928; the couple adopted two children. He was a 32nd-degree Mason and a Shriner. He died of hepatitis in a Dallas hospital on December 25, 1960.

== Legacy ==
Payne judged Florence the person whose support was considered most essential to the success of any civic project in Dallas. His friend Willis M. Tate, president of Southern Methodist University, joked that the F in his name must stand for "future." Several Dallas-area institutions carry his name. Fred Florence Hall at Southern Methodist University was named for him. The Dallas Independent School District's Young Men's Leadership Academy at Fred F. Florence Middle School is also named for him. The Republic National Bank Building, which he championed, was designated a Dallas landmark in 2004 and added to the National Register of Historic Places in 2005.
