= Dallas Pedestrian Network =

Pedestrian walkways in Dallas, US

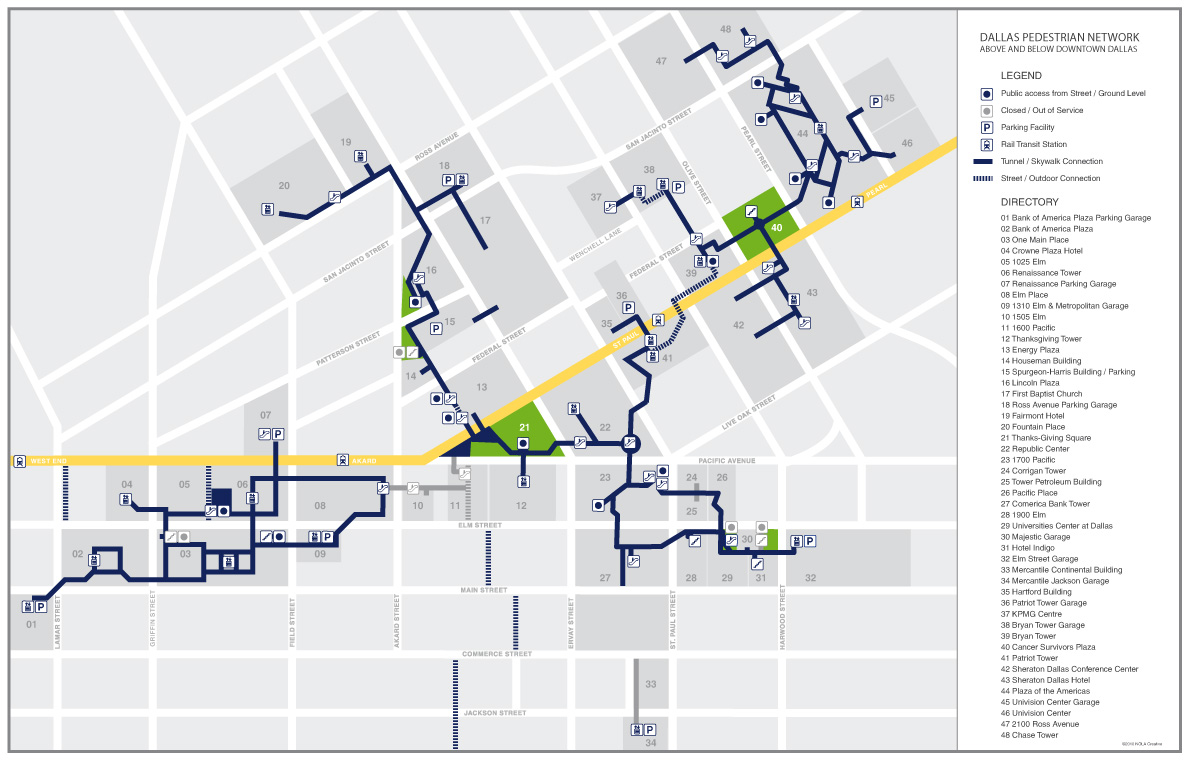
2009 Map of the Dallas Pedestrian Network

The Dallas Pedestrian Network or Dallas Pedway is a system of grade-separated walkways covering thirty-six city blocks of Downtown Dallas, Texas, United States. The system connects buildings, garages and parks through tunnels and above-ground skybridges. The network contained an underground city of shops, restaurants and offices during weekday business hours, but has been largely abandoned, and is no longer continuous.

The underground network was the idea of Montreal urban planner Vincent Ponte, who was also responsible for Montreal's Underground City.

== Connected to the Dallas Pedestrian Network ==
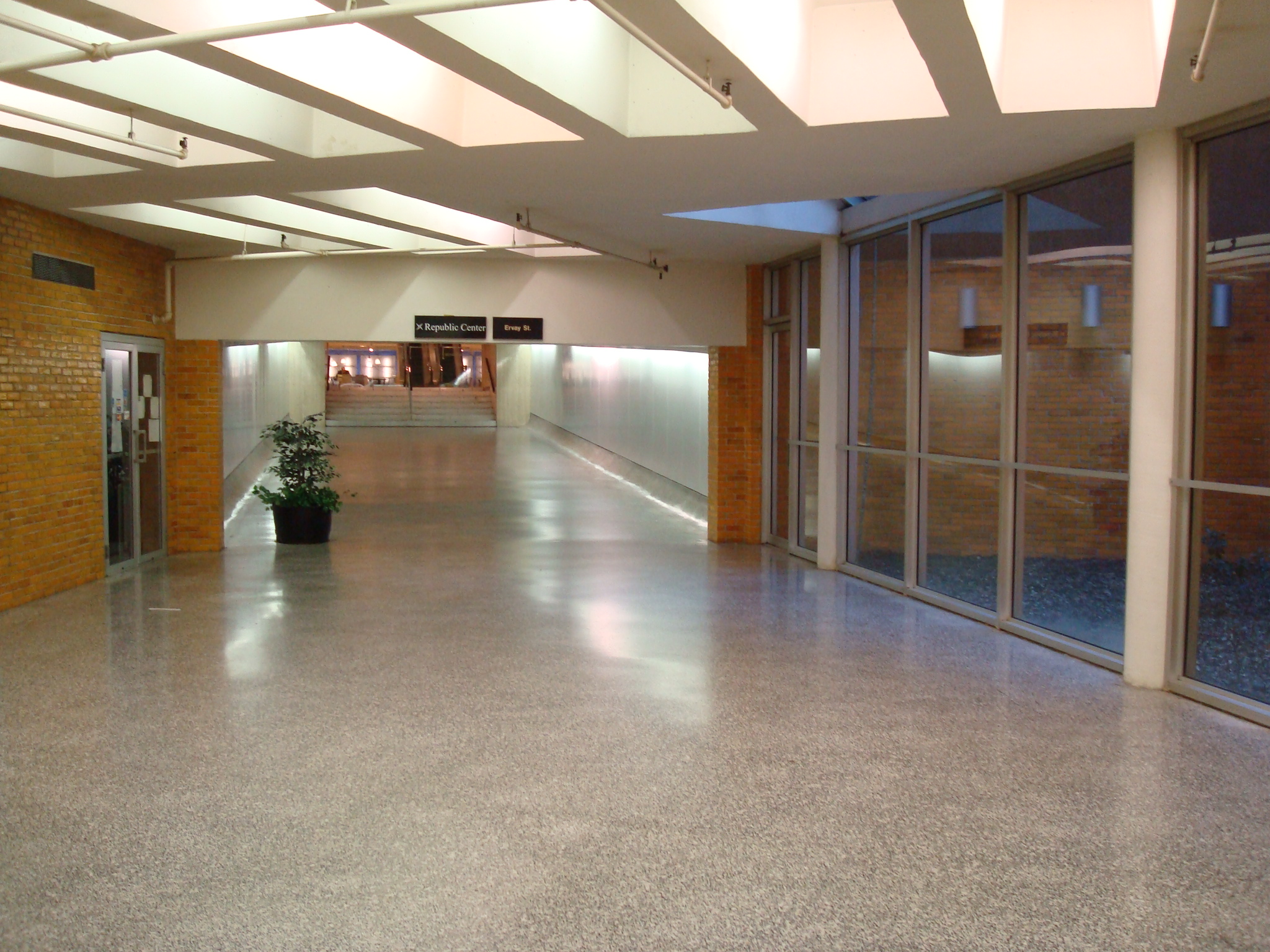
A Dallas Pedestrian Network tunnel runs beneath Thanks-Giving Square

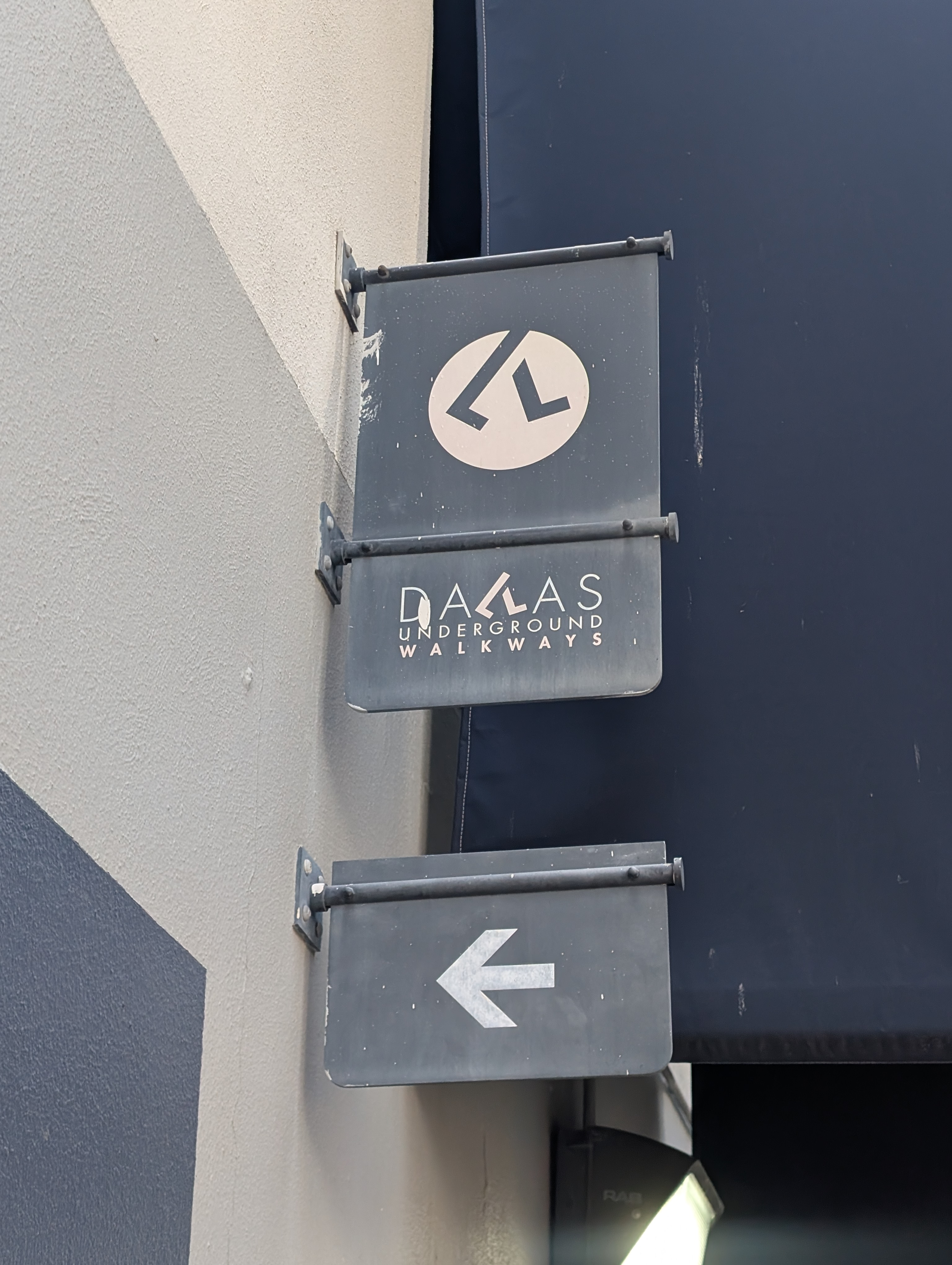
Signage for the tunnel entrance in the Renaissance Tower parking garage

Hotels:

- Sheraton Dallas Hotel
- Fairmont Hotel
- Dallas Marriott Downtown
- Hotel Indigo
- Crowne Plaza Dallas Downtown
- Westin
- Cambria Dallas Downtown (Tower Petroleum Building)

Office Buildings:

- Comerica Bank Tower
- Chase Tower
- 1700 Pacific
- Bank of America Plaza
- Renaissance Tower
- Fountain Place
- Plaza of the Americas
- Bryan Tower
- KPMG Centre
- Patriot Tower
- Energy Plaza
- Ross Tower
- One Main Place
- Republic Center
- Pacific Place
- 1600 Pacific Tower
- The Drever

Parks

- Cancer Survivors Plaza
- Thanks-Giving Square

Residential Buildings

- Titche-Goettinger Building
- Gables Republic
- 1900 Pacific Residences (Corrigan Tower)
- 1505 Elm

Other

- First Baptist Church
- Universities Center at Dallas
- Majestic Garage
- Elm Street Garage
- Metropolitan Garage

== Changing attitudes ==
In 2005, then-mayor Laura Miller told the New York Times the system of tunnels was "the worst urban planning decision that Dallas has ever made ... if I could take a cement mixer and pour cement in and clog up the tunnels, I would do it today".

The Dallas Pedestrian Network is targeted for de-emphasis by the Downtown Dallas 360 initiative, in an effort to bring more focus on street-level activity. While initial plans had called for a more direct shutdown, a report in April 2012 concluded that a series of measures discouraging further growth or unnecessary maintenance of the system were all that were called for; Downtown Dallas Inc. CEO John Crawford concluded, "[The underground tunnels] aren't much of an issue anymore."
