= James W. Aston =

James W. Aston (died October 2, 1995) was an American city manager and banker. A 1933 graduate of Texas A&M, he was city manager of Bryan and then Dallas, Texas, before serving as a colonel in the Army Air Corps during World War II. He later became president and chairman of Republic National Bank of Dallas.

== Early life ==
Aston was the son of Joe A. Aston of Farmersville, Texas. At Texas A&M he was commander of the Corps of Cadets, captain of the football team and president of the senior class, graduating in 1933 with a degree in civil engineering.

== Municipal career ==
After graduating, Aston went to work for the City of Dallas as a laborer on a street-paving crew. Following a nine-month apprenticeship under city manager John North Edy, he was assigned to the budget division of the city planning office; when Hal Moseley became city manager in 1935, Aston became his assistant and later assistant director of finance and director of personnel. In February 1939 he was named city manager of Bryan, Texas. That July, the Dallas City Council unanimously chose him to succeed Moseley, effective August 1, 1939. He was 28, among the youngest people to hold the post in a major American city.

== Military service ==
In April 1941 Aston, a lieutenant, was ordered to active duty on the staff of the Quartermaster General in Washington, D.C. The Dallas City Council granted him a year's leave of absence, and he reported for duty on April 15. During World War II he served in the Air Transport Command of the Army Air Forces, rising to the rank of colonel. He received the Distinguished Service Medal and the Legion of Merit.

== Banking career ==
Aston became president of Republic National Bank of Dallas in about 1957, succeeding Fred F. Florence. D Magazine credited him with converting what had been a one-man bank under Florence into a team-managed institution with over a billion dollars in assets. While other large Texas banks rushed to acquire smaller banks after holding companies became possible, Aston held Republic back until it could sell its oil, gas and real estate properties at a price reflecting its undeveloped leases; the eventual $60 million sale was described as his crowning achievement. He served as chairman of the holding company, Republic of Texas Corporation, until 1977, when he was succeeded by James D. Berry.

== Civic activities and honors ==
Aston served as a director of the Boy Scouts of America, the Cotton Bowl Council and its athletic association, and the Dallas Citizens Council. A fullback at Texas A&M, he was named in 1957 to Sports Illustrated's Silver Anniversary All-American football team. He was president of the Association of Former Students in 1961 and received its Distinguished Alumnus award in 1967. He played a role in the building of Dallas Fort Worth International Airport and the University of Texas Southwestern Medical Center.

== Personal life ==
Aston married Sarah Orth, daughter of W. A. Orth of Dallas. They had a son, James, and five grandchildren.

== Legacy ==
James W. Aston Park, a 0.4-acre grove of live oaks between Live Oak Street, Harwood Street and Pacific Avenue in downtown Dallas, was established in his name in 1983. In 2019 it was incorporated into the larger Pacific Plaza, where its 23 mature oaks remain as Aston Grove. The James W. Aston Ambulatory Care Center at UT Southwestern is also named for him.
