= 211 North Ervay =

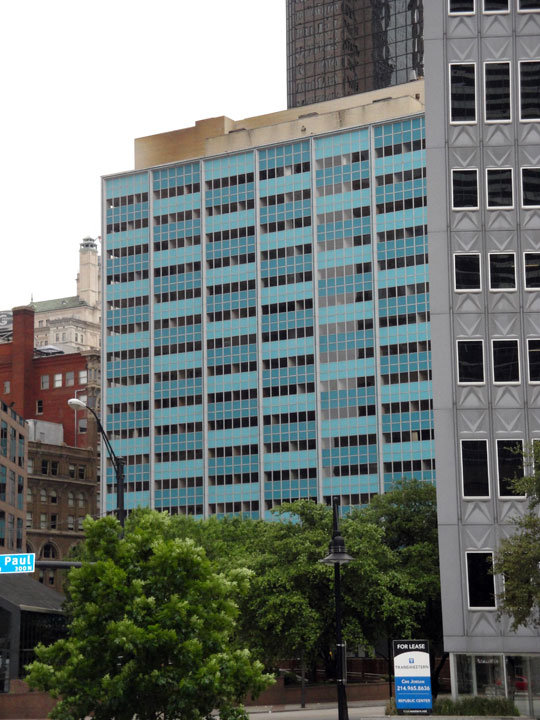
- Interactive map of the 211 North Ervay area

General information
- Status: Completed
- Type: Office
- Location: 211 N Ervay Street; Dallas, Texas (USA)
- Coordinates: 32°46′56″N 96°47′52″W
- Opening: 1958

Height
- Roof: 250 ft (76 m)

Technical details
- Floor count: 20 (18 occupiable floors above grade)
- Floor area: 165,000 sq ft (15,300 m^{2})
- Lifts/elevators: 4

Design and construction
- Architects: Hedrick & Stanley
- Developer: Leo F. Corrigan
- Main contractor: The Beck Group
- 211 N. Ervay
- U.S. Historic district – Contributing property
- Part of: Dallas Downtown Historic District (ID04000894)
- Designated CP: August 11, 2006

211 North Ervay is a high rise located at 211 North Ervay Street in the City Center District of Dallas, Texas, United States. The building rises 250 feet (76 meters) and contains 18 floors of office space. The colorful building of modernist design is situated on a prominent city corner and adjacent to Thanks-Giving Square.

== History ==
211 North Ervay was designed by architects Hedrick & Stanley for developer Leo Corrigan as his fourth major downtown office building (after the Corrigan Tower, Burt Tower and Adolphus Tower). The tower was built on a slim corner lot, 50 feet (15 m) in width and 200 feet (61 m) long, and replaced early commercial structures. Adjacent to the structure was the Palace Theater, one of many on Elm Street's historic Theater Row.

The building's facade was covered with continuous glass windows along with alternating azure and aquamarine porcelain spandrels. The colorful design was a popular way to add color to otherwise bland urban skylines of the mid-twentieth century. The ground floor, containing the main entrance on Ervay, was covered in granite and recessed to provide extra sidewalk width for street level retail space; the second floor was covered in mosaics. Opened in 1958 as a general office building, it was popular with insurance companies, law firms, and aviation-related companies.

The building was sold in 1971 and 1977; the second sale resulted in a complete remodeling of the lobby, elevators and changes in the exterior facade of the first two levels. Over successive years occupancy rates slowly declined as modern skyscrapers such as 1700 Pacific, Thanksgiving Tower and Comerica Bank Tower surrounded the building. The building was sold again in 1986, and by 1995 it was completely vacant. Labeled an eyesore, in 2004 Dallas Mayor Laura Miller campaigned to have the building demolished for a downtown park. In response, Preservation Dallas included the building in its inaugural list of Dallas’ Most Endangered Historic Places, citing its importance in the National Register's Dallas Downtown Historic District and an example of the vanishing "cool blue" architecture of the 1950s.

In 2005 3J Development purchased the building and planned to convert the building into residential units. The renovation plan, abandoned in 2007, would have altered the facade and removed the distinctive blue panels. The structure was one of seven downtown buildings targeted by Dallas Mayor Tom Leppert for numerous code and fire hazards in 2009, resulting in a cleanup of the ground floor and updated safety systems. After failed redevelopment plans, efforts to demolish the building were renewed in 2012 when it was reported the building may be purchased and donated to the City of Dallas.

In May 2014, FORBES Top 10 Business Accelerator Tech Wildcatters announced that it would be leasing 18,000 square feet in the Ervay building.

In September 2014, Fort Work announced plans to relocate its coworking home from North Dallas to the Ervay building.

In 2023, following purchase by a new owner, it was announced that the building would be converted into 238 residential units while preserving the exterior.

In February 2024, the building sold for $8 million in a foreclosure auction. The new owner has stated that they still plan to convert the building into residential or hospitality.
