= Leo Corrigan =

American real estate investor

- Born: Leo Francis Corrigan; August 30, 1894; St. Louis, Missouri, United States
- Died: June 12, 1975 (aged 80); Dallas, Texas, United States
- Occupation: Businessman
- Spouse: Catherine Redman (m. 1917)
- Children: 2

Leo Francis Corrigan (August 30, 1894 – June 12, 1975) was an American real estate investor and developer, who was described as the country's largest landlord. He reportedly owned more commercial property than any other individual in the United States in the early 1970s.

== Early life and education ==
Corrigan was the second oldest of eight children. He was born into a poor family that lived in a "St. Louis slum". He went to grammar school in St. Louis, came to Dallas in 1910 and sold classified advertising for the Dallas Dispatch.

== Career ==
In 1917, one of his clients, a real estate investor, offered him a job leasing office space downtown. He soon struck out on his own, buying and building on a vacant lot at the corner of Lemmon Avenue and Wycliff Street. Corrigan began buying, leasing and reinvesting in suburban shopping areas, and soon expanded into buying and building hotels and apartments. Corrigan secured leases from merchants and used them as collateral to finance his developments, as he had little capital of his own. His holdings included the Sinclair Building in Fort Worth, the Stoneleigh, Maple Terrace, Thomas Building and Stevens Park Apartments in Dallas, and several apartment buildings in Houston and Shreveport.

He and Leland Fiske were involved in one of the largest real estate transactions in history, the purchase of what was then the world's largest apartment complex in Washington, D.C., along with two other developments. Corrigan purchased a majority interest in the Adolphus Hotel in 1948.

Corrigan is said to have made several unsuccessful attempts to buy the Empire State Building. He bought the Tower Petroleum Building in 1943. He also owned the Corrigan Tower, 211 North Ervay, and other office buildings in Dallas.

Corrigan also developed the Hong Kong Hilton and the Emerald Beach in Nassau. For a time he also owned the Biltmore Hotel in Los Angeles.

== Personal life ==
Carrigan married Catherine Redman in 1917 and they had two children, Louise and Leo Francis Jr. He and his wife donated to Southern Methodist University and Austin College to endow chairs in real estate. Corrigan's grandchildren continue to run Corrigan Properties and Corrigan Investments.
