= Hartford Building (Dallas) =

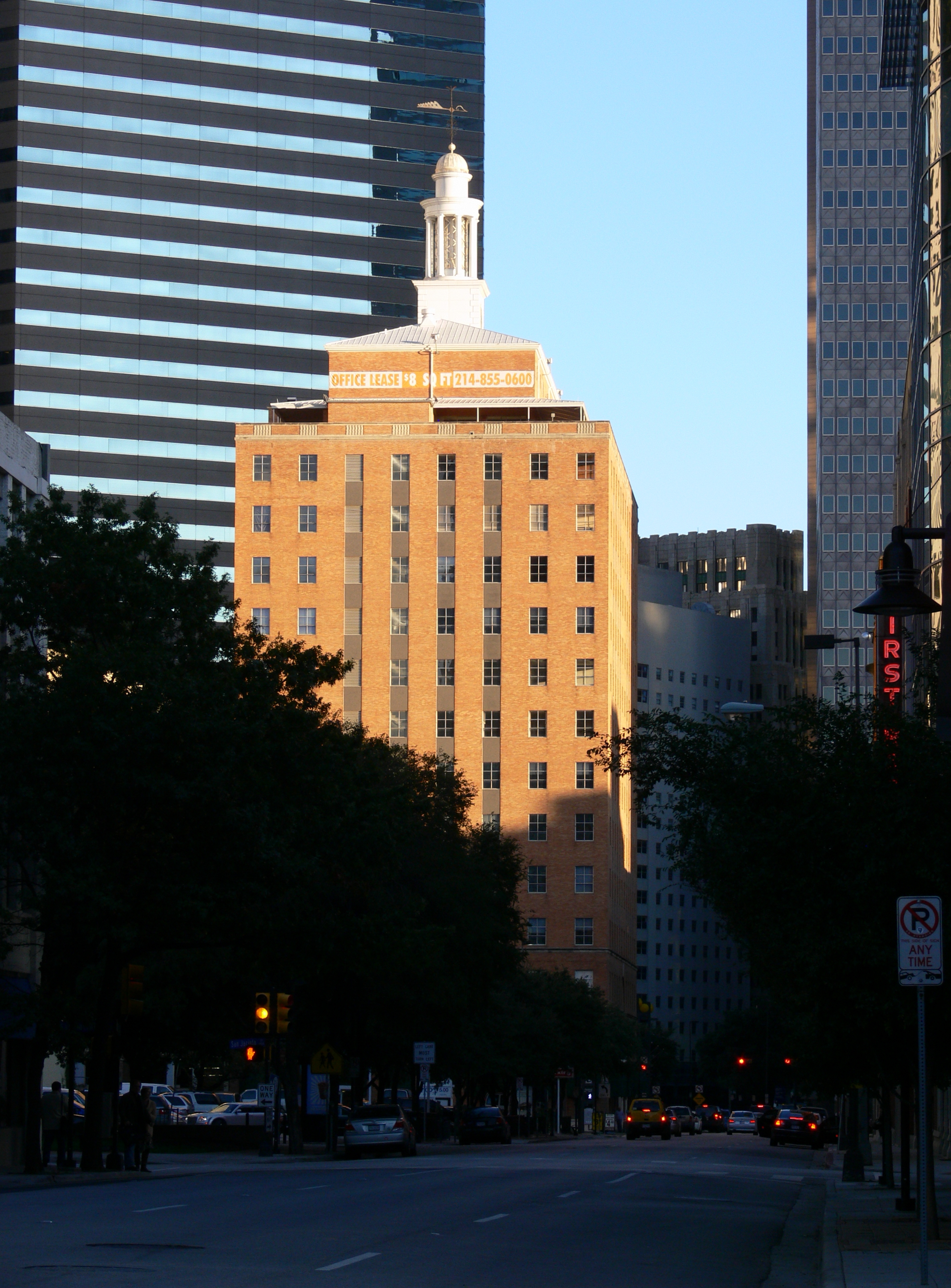
- Interactive map of the Hartford Building area

General information
- Status: Completed
- Type: Office
- Location: 400 N St. Paul Street; Dallas, Texas (USA)
- Coordinates: 32°47′03″N 96°47′52″W
- Opening: January 25, 1960
- Management: Good Signature Management, L.L.C.

Technical details
- Floor count: 14
- Floor area: 166,000 sq ft (15,400 m^{2})

Design and construction
- Developer: Trammell Crow

Website
- www.goodsignature.com

The Hartford Building is a mid-rise 14 story, 34,000 sq foot skyscraper located in the City Center District of downtown Dallas, Texas (USA) and is adjacent to DART's St. Paul Station.

== History ==
The $5 million office building, built during a time of large insurance growth in Dallas, was constructed to serve as the southwestern regional home office for the Hartford Fire Insurance Group. It was developed by Trammell Crow and Eugene Locke, and opened in 1960. An incident occurred during construction in 1959, when a 20-foot (6.1 m) steel beam and a brick fell to street below from one of the upper floors. The beam pierced a truck and was embedded into the pavement and the brick bounced off a car below; amazingly, no one was injured. The building's Bryan Street Garage with 400 spaces was replaced with a shared-use garage built for the adjacent Patriot Tower in 1981.

The building was sold in 1961, 1967, 1994, and 2013.
