= Pacific Plaza Park =

Park in Dallas, Texas, United States

Pacific Plaza
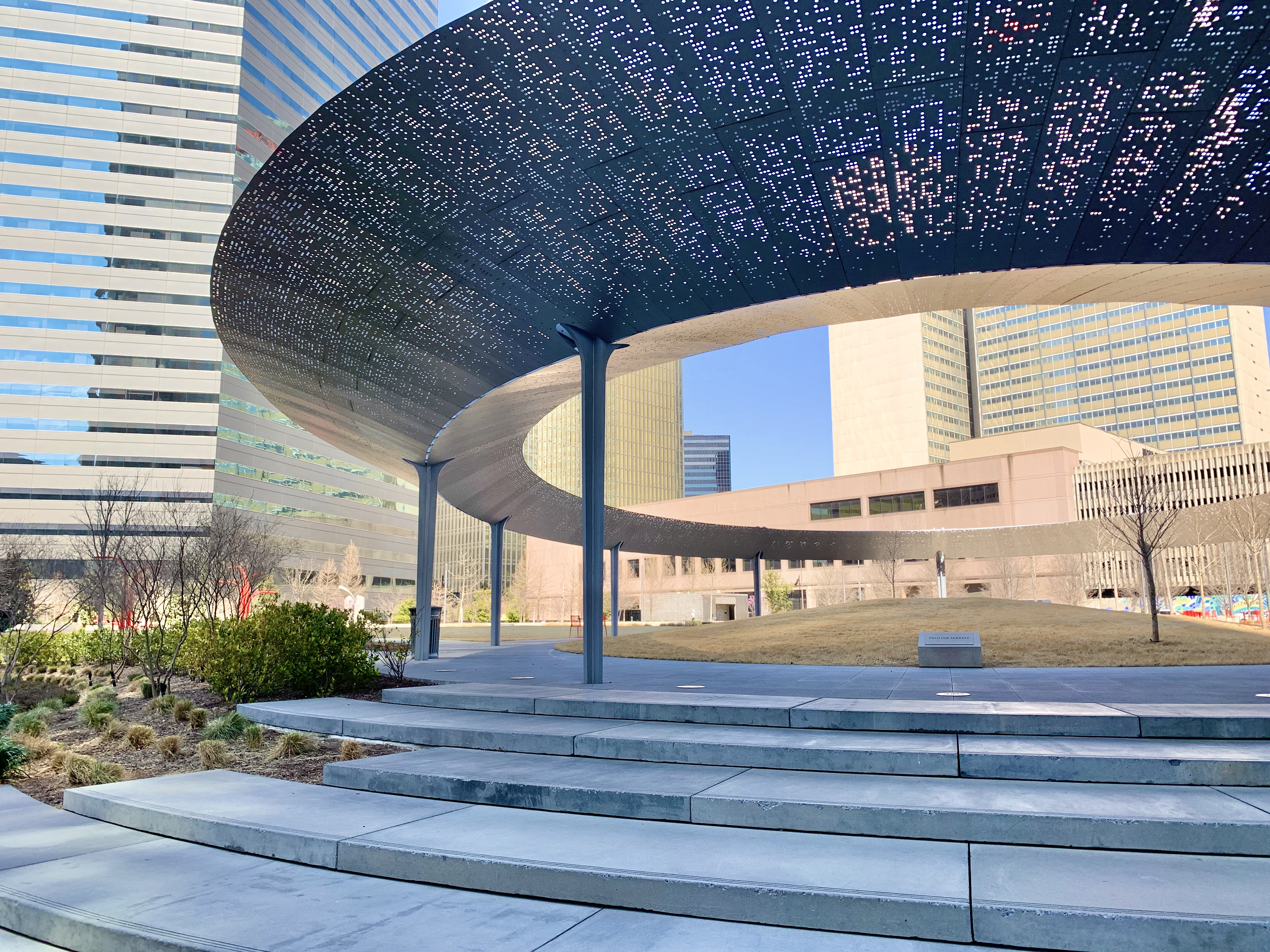
- Pacific Plaza Park
- Interactive map of Pacific Plaza
- Type: public park
- Location: Dallas, Texas
- Coordinates: 32°47′01″N 96°47′46″W
- Area: 3.4-acre (14,000 m^{2})
- Operator: City of Dallas
- Status: now open

Pacific Plaza Park is a 3.7-acre (1.5 ha) public park located in downtown Dallas, Texas, United States. The park is located between St. Paul Street and Harwood Street, north of Pacific Avenue in the City Center District, and opened to the public Oct. 14, 2019. The City of Dallas acquired the land with help from the Trust for Public Land.

== History ==
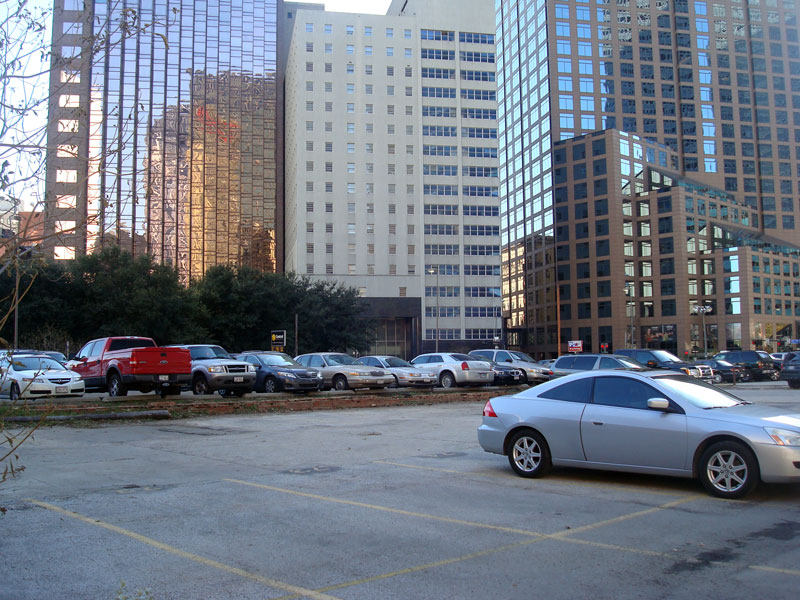
Pacific Plaza was previously parking lots. Aston Park, Pacific Place, Corrigan Tower and 1700 Pacific can be seen in the background.

The site is one of the larger open areas in the City Center District and had been eyed for several projects in the past. In 1985 RepublicBank Corp., one of the largest banks in the Southwest and owner of the adjacent Republic Center, announced plans to construct a 60-story, 1,400,000-square-foot (130,000 m^{2}) building designed by Skidmore, Owings and Merrill. The $250 million complex would have also contained a three-story retail center surrounding a rotunda, landscaped courtyards and formal gardens. Plans were terminated in 1987 when rival InterFirst Corp. acquired the company.

== Design ==
The park incorporates the existing Aston Park, a grove of mature trees dedicated in 1983.
