= Pacific Place (Dallas) =

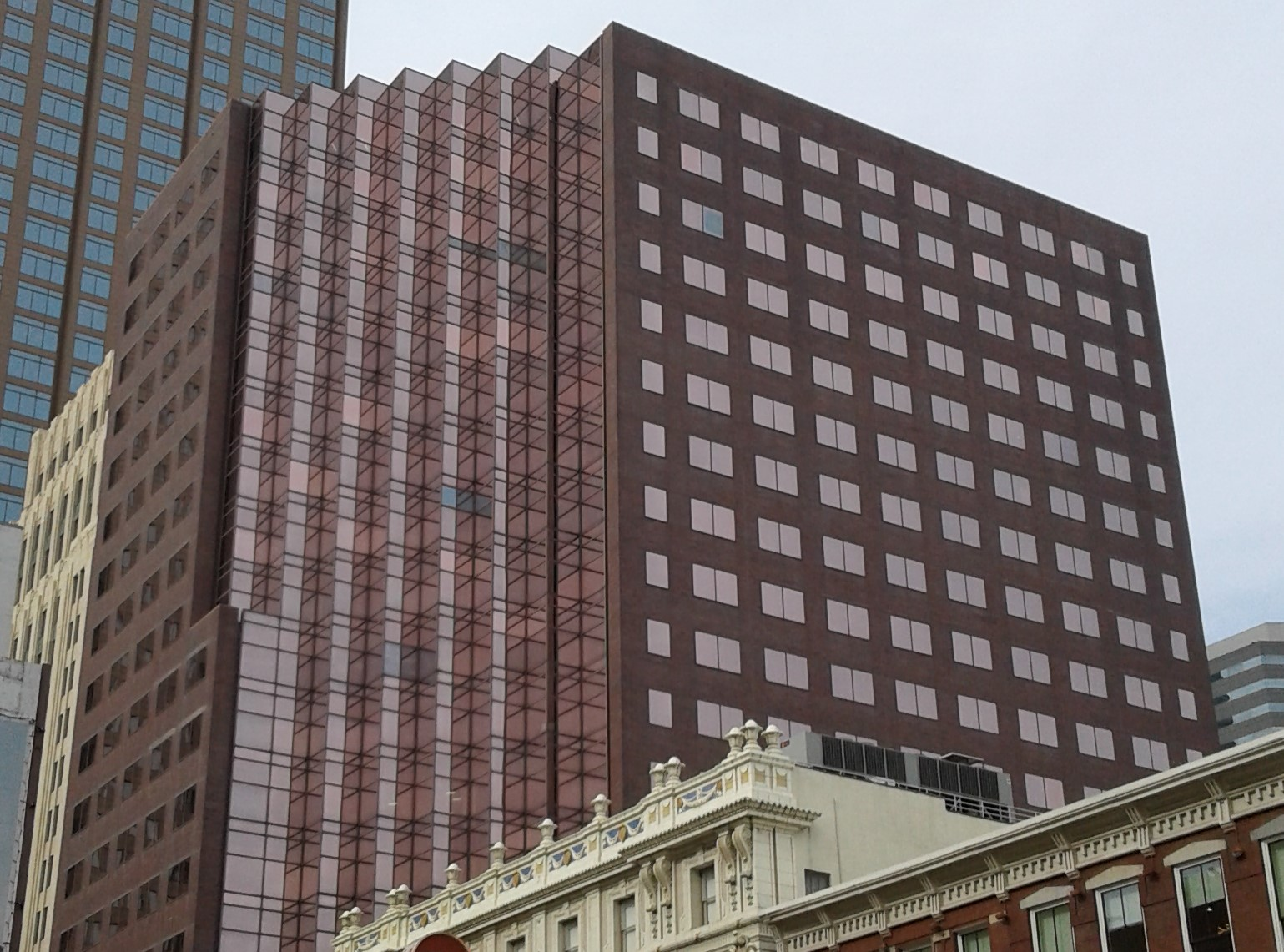
- The Pacific Place building in 2018
- Interactive map of the Pacific Place area

General information
- Status: Completed
- Type: Office
- Location: 1910 Pacific Avenue; Dallas, Texas (USA)
- Coordinates: 32°46′58″N 96°47′43″W
- Opening: 1982

Technical details
- Floor count: 20
- Floor area: 324,153 sq ft (30,114.8 m^{2})

Pacific Place is a Class-A office skyscraper located at 1910 Pacific Avenue in the City Center District of Dallas, Texas. The structure contains 20 floors of office space and stands adjacent to the historic Majestic Theatre. It is connected to the Dallas Pedestrian Network and sits across Pacific Avenue from the recently completed Pacific Plaza Park. It lies within the Harwood Historic District, but is not a contributing structure.

== History ==
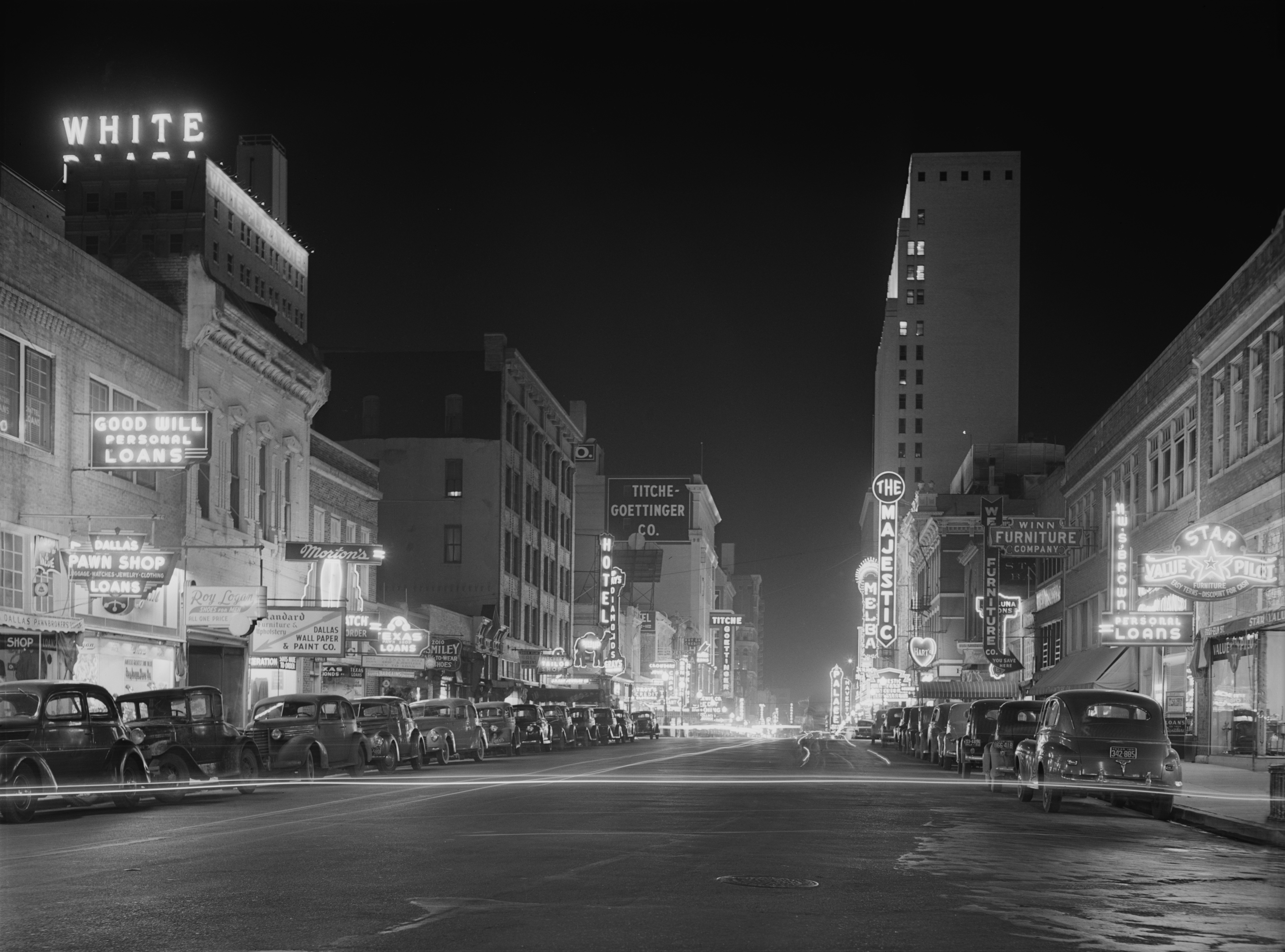
Theater Row on Elm Street, January 1942. Pacific Place now stands where the Melba Theater was located

Pacific Place, constructed of steel, masonry and purple reflective glass, opened in 1982 as a multi-tenant office tower. It was constructed on the site of the historic 1921 Melba Theatre, one of several theaters along Elm Street's Theater Row, and an adjacent parking structure. Its narrow building site resulted in recessed courtyard entrances on both Elm Street and Pacific Avenue, while the angled facade provided multiple corner offices and allowed light to reach the neighboring Corrigan Tower. The second level of the building was connected via skywalk to the Dallas Pedestrian Network, providing access to parking and retail facilities.

The building suffered high vacancy rates due to the economic recession of the 2000s. By 2008, the doors were closed, although the building's public spaces were still well-maintained. Several proposals were developed, including a study to converted the building into 198 residential units. The building sold in April 2010 to Boxer Property for $5.3 million. Following renovation, it reopened for leasing in April 2012.
