= United States Post Office and Courthouse (Dallas, Texas) =

U.S. Post Office and Courthouse
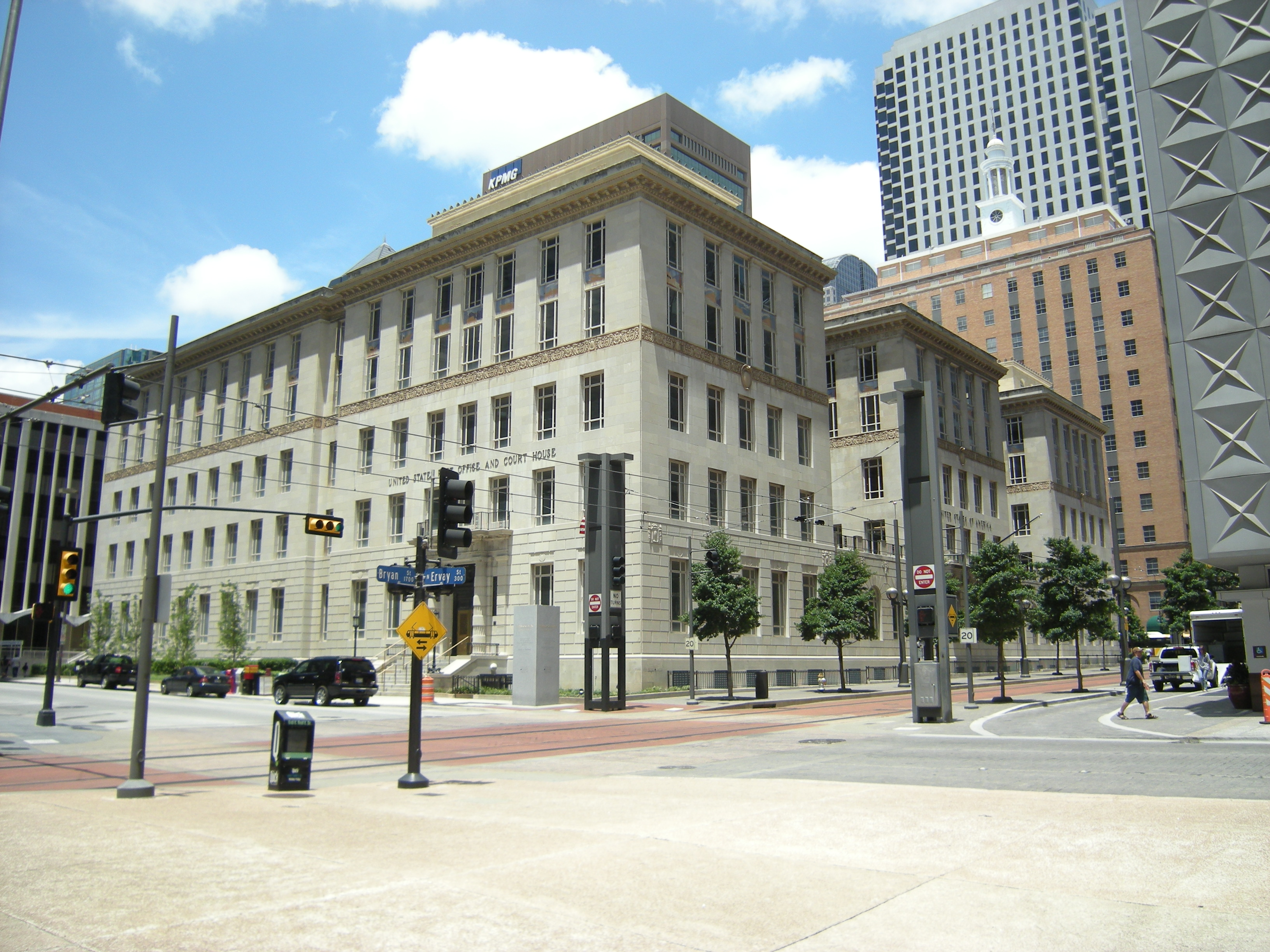
- U.S. Post Office and Courthouse
- Interactive map of the U.S. Post Office and Courthouse area

General information
- Type: Federal Government
- Architectural style: Renaissance Revival
- Location: 400 North Ervay Street
- Coordinates: 32.783728°N 96.798164°W
- Completed: 1930

Technical details
- Floor count: 5

Design and construction
- Architects: W.B. Hayes and Office of the Supervising Architect
- Awards

Dallas Landmark
- Designated: April 5, 1983

The U.S. Post Office and Courthouse is an historic post office and courthouse building located at 400 North Ervay Street in the City Center District of downtown Dallas, Texas (USA). The historic building retains an operating post office on the ground level with apartments on upper floors.

== History ==
A new federal building was conceived to replace the "Old" Post Office and Federal Building five blocks to the south (later replaced by the Mercantile National Bank Building). A site at Ervay, Federal, St. Paul, and Bryan was chosen, and $50,000 was allocated by the U.S. Congress. The sum was later raised to $2,300,000. Construction began in 1929 and the building opened in November 1930.

The building served as the home for 40 Federal bureaus and agencies, two United States District Courts and two District Judges. As the Federal Government's presence in Dallas grew over 310,000 square feet (29,000 m^{2}) were leased in surrounding buildings to house larger agencies. The U.S. District and Circuit Courts moved to the new Earle Cabell Federal Building and Courthouse in 1971, following the departure of the Post Office regional headquarters in the same year.

In 1984 the U.S. Postal Service selected Woodbine Development Corp. to renovate the historic building and build a 34-story office tower behind and above the building. The addition would have included a 700,000-square-foot (65,000 m^{2}) office building and 900-car underground parking garage along with retail, restaurant and office facilities. The project never came to fruition.

The structure was later renovated for the Postal Service by BRW Architects and Turner Construction. Work included the creation of a parking facility in the basement, restoration and renovation of the exterior facade and interior public spaces, a complete overhaul of MEP systems, upgrading of lighting, installation of a fire sprinkler system, and all necessary modifications to meet today's ADA accessibility criteria. All renovation work was conducted in close association with historic preservation authorities at national, state and local levels.

In 2002 a developer launched unsuccessful plans to convert all but the ground floor into 91 loft apartments, at a cost of $14 million, to be called the Lofts at Thanksgiving Square. In 2011 redevelopment commenced, and the upper levels were converted to 78 residential units. Original public spaces were restored for common use and a rooftop terrace was added to the building. U.S. Postal Service remains a tenant on the ground floor.

== Architecture ==
Circa 1930s postcard of the building

The substantial building spans the length of Bryan Street and was constructed in a Renaissance Revival style popular with the U.S. Treasury Department. The steel-framed structure contains 5 floors plus one basement level and is clad in Indiana limestone. Soon after opening, the exterior design was criticized for being a disappointment and too simple, lacking any ornamentation. On upper floors, seemingly out of place, are colored terra cotta spandrels picturing the history of mail transportation. The inside of the building contains an understated but impressive lobby with rows of window stations flanked by regional murals above the two entrance doorways.
