= 505 North Ervay =

- Interactive map of the 505 North Ervay area

General information
- Status: Demolished
- Type: Office
- Location: 505 N Ervay; Dallas, Texas (USA)
- Coordinates: 32°47′02″N 96°47′57″W
- Construction started: 1945
- Opening: 1948
- Demolished: 2019
- Cost: $2,000,000

Technical details
- Floor count: 11 + basement
- Floor area: 12,000 sq ft (1,100 m^{2})
- Lifts/elevators: 3

Design and construction
- Architects: J.N. McCammon & Walter Ahlschlager
- Developer: Monroe Building Corporation

505 North Ervay, also known as the Reserve Loan Life Building, was a mid-rise skyscraper located in the City Center District of downtown Dallas, Texas, United States. Originally an office building, it was part of the First Baptist Church campus until the building was imploded on June 29, 2019.

== History ==
Originally planned as an 8-story structure, construction began in 1945 on a square site at the corner of Federal Street and North Ervay Street. After a delay, developer Monroe Building Corporation revised the design and the structure was expanded to include three additional floors. The building was constructed of steel, brick and glass; the use of 5-foot-wide (1.5 m) exterior floor separations gave the building a horizontal emphasis. Upon completion in 1948, the building was sold to the Reserve Loan Life Insurance Company, which occupied the building's first four floors. The remainder of the office space was leased to various companies including insurance and advertising firms. It was also home to offices for the United States Secret Service, whose testimony served a role in the 1963 John F. Kennedy assassination's Warren Commission. The building was sold to InsurOmedic Life Insurance Company in 1955, which installed a 35-foot-high (11 m) sign at the top of the building.

In 1972 investor Bill Gaynier bought and renovated the structure—painting the exterior, adding entrance canopies and opening the ground floor to pedestrian traffic. The improvement resulted in a near 100 percent occupancy rate by 1975, and the building was renamed and re-signed the Mutual of Omaha Building after the new lead tenant. By the late 1980s, after Gaynier's death and a resulting lawsuit over ownership, the building had become mostly vacant. First Baptist Church of Dallas, which owned several adjoining structures, purchased the building in 1990 for $1.1 million. It was partially used for education space before its closure.

The building was demolished by implosion on Saturday, June 29, 2019.
