= Vincent Ponte =

Montreal urban planner Vincent Ponte

Vincent Pasciuto Ponte (October 27, 1919 – February 9, 2006) was a Canadian Modernist urban planner in Montreal, Quebec. Ponte was born in Boston, MA.

Ponte received a fine arts degree from Harvard and worked for the architecture firm I.M. Pei. He drafted the master plans for both Place Ville Marie and Place Bonaventure. Ponte also designed the underground malls in Montreal and the Dallas.

== Quotes ==
"By the year 2000 the Queen Elizabeth will be a fleabag. It's all part of the way society changes. We don't build things to last anymore. We're affluent and we can afford to keep throwing things away and replacing them with newer, bigger and better."

"All the great cities of the world were created by kings and emperors – who had taste. You just can't stop everything. You have to let development continue. There are too many investments, too much money at stake."
