= Corrigan Tower =

High rise in Dallas, Texas, United States

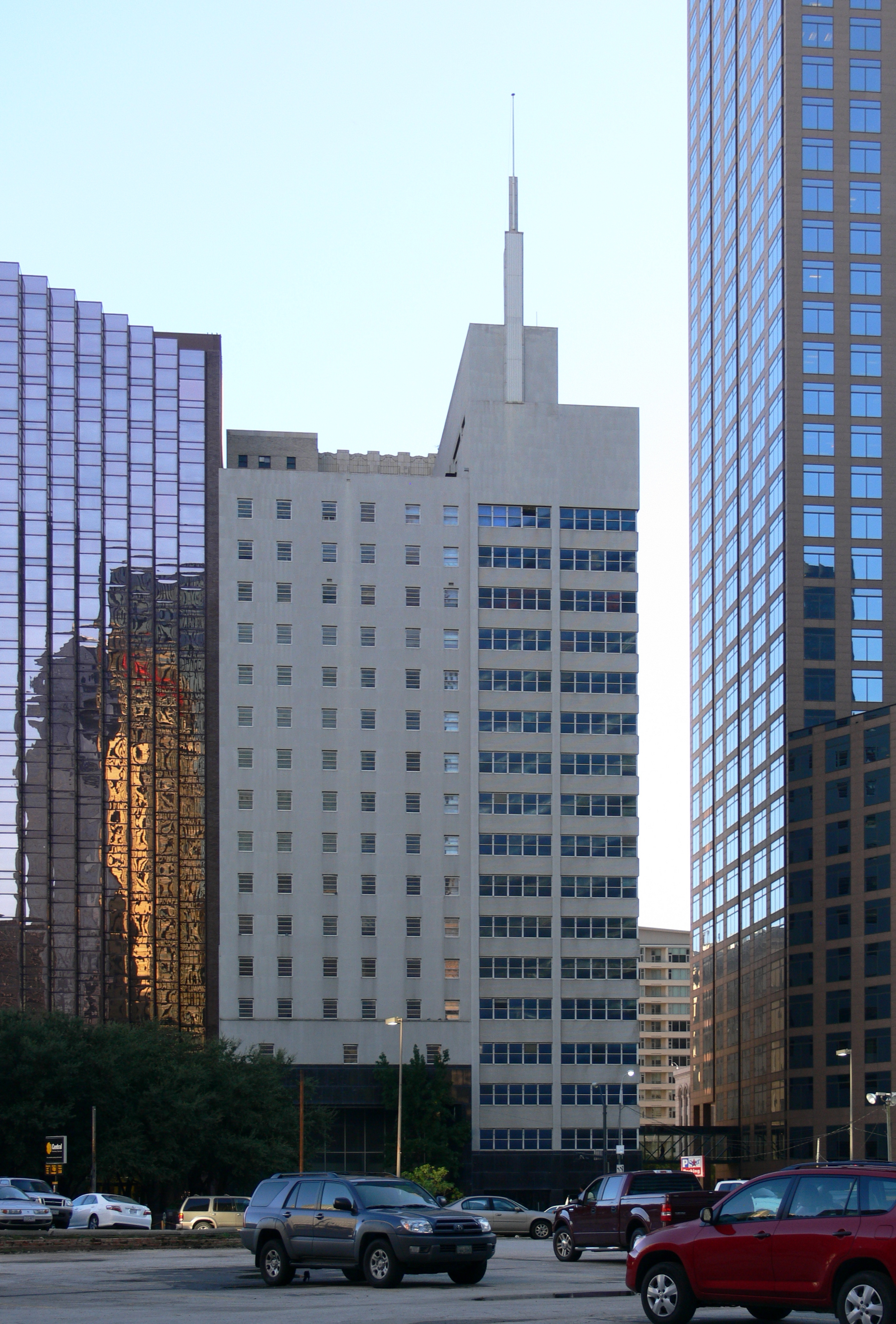
- Interactive map of the Corrigan Tower area

General information
- Status: Completed
- Type: Apartments (previously Office)
- Architectural style: Modern, Curtain wall
- Location: 1900 Pacific Ave., Dallas, Texas, United States
- Coordinates: 32°46′58″N 96°47′45″W
- Opening: 1952
- Cost: $5 million

Height
- Antenna spire: 282 ft (86 m)
- Roof: 260 ft (79 m)

Technical details
- Floor count: 17
- Floor area: 215,000 sq ft (20,000 m^{2})
- Lifts/elevators: 5

Design and construction
- Architect: Wyatt C. Hedrick
- Developer: Leo F. Corrigan
- Corrigan Tower
- U.S. Historic district – Contributing property
- Part of: Dallas Downtown Historic District (ID04000894)
- Designated CP: August 11, 2006

Corrigan Tower, also known as 1900 Pacific or 1900 Pacific Residences, is a high rise located at 1900 Pacific Avenue in the City Center District of Dallas, Texas. The building contains 20 floors, now made up of apartments but originally office space, and is of modernist design. It is situated on the high-traffic corner of St. Paul Street and Pacific Avenue, across from Aston Park and the future Pacific Plaza Park. It lies within the Harwood Historic District, but is not a contributing structure.

== History ==
The site was previously the location of small commercial structures and the 1,500 seat Tower Theater, which was located at the rear of and accessed through the Tower Petroleum Building.

After developer Leo Corrigan purchased the Tower Petroleum Building in 1942, Corrigan Tower was designed by architect Wyatt C. Hedrick as a 215,000-square-foot (20,000 m^{2}) addition to the adjoining building. The new building was connected on floors 4-14, creating a two-building complex with 325,000 square feet (30,200 m^{2}) of general office space. Construction began in 1951 and the building opened in 1952.

To preserve the Tower Theater, it was necessary for Corrigan Tower to build around the structure along Pacific Avenue. A new fire stair for evacuation of the theater balcony was constructed, which led from the balcony through the building to St. Paul Street. Corrigan Tower was separated by a 20-foot-wide (6 m) light well to preserve the north façade of the Tower Petroleum Building. The two buildings shared a wall only at the easternmost bay, which allowed occupants of Corrigan Tower to exit directly into Tower Petroleum and access the building's fire stair. The entrance to the building was located on St. Paul Street (although patrons could also enter through the Tower Petroleum Building), and the lobby featured 5 high speed elevators. The building became a popular location for insurance and financial service tenants.

The building's lower levels were heavily altered during a renovation in 1979, although the upper levels were never changed. The Tower Theater was demolished and in its place was constructed a new, 3-story entrance and lobby on Pacific Avenue which was connected to the original lobby space. Black granite was added to the base of the building to match the Tower Petroleum Building. A few years later during the construction of 1700 Pacific across St. Paul Street, a skybridge was constructed within the light well to connect the buildings with neighboring Pacific Place and the Dallas Pedestrian Network.

The building was sold in 1995. By 2003 the building was closed and options for residential conversion were being considered, included using the Corrigan Tower as a parking garage for the neighboring Tower Petroleum Building. In 2007 the owner, Rita Sweeney, requested $12 million in incentives from the City of Dallas to demolish the structure and in its place construct a 52-story condominium tower designed by Michael Graves. Parking would have been provided beneath the future Pacific Plaza Park. After Rita Sweeney's death in 2007 and the economic recession, however, the project was put on hold and the property listed for sale.

In recent years, Corrigan Tower was redone as apartments and now uses 1900 Pacific Residences to identify itself.

== Design ==
The structure, representative of modernism in the 1950s, rises 17 stories as one mass with a mechanical room and spire with flag pole that rises an additional 22 feet (6.7 m). The façades of the building were designed as solid masonry planes of light brick without any detail until they meet the northwest corner, which is primarily glass with ribbon windows and thin brick spandrels.

== See also ==
- National Register of Historic Places listings in Dallas County, Texas
