= Younan Properties =

American real estate investment company

Younan Properties, Inc.
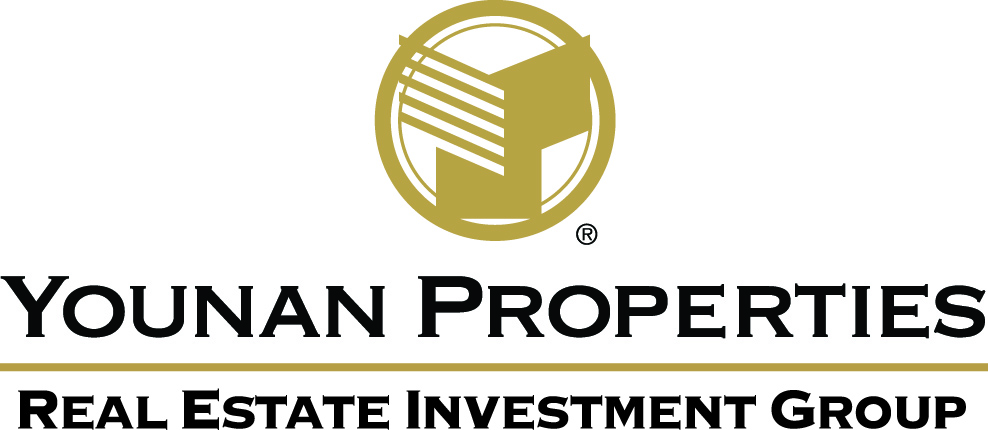
- Industry: Commercial Real Estate and Property Management
- Founded: 2002
- Founder: Zaya S. Younan
- Headquarters: Los Angeles, CA
- Website: www.younanproperties.com

Younan Properties, Inc. is a commercial real estate investment company, headquartered in Los Angeles, California and founded in 2002 by Zaya S. Younan. The company also has regional offices in Dallas, Houston, Colorado, Chicago and Phoenix.

In 2016, Younan Properties expanded into France, forming a French-based holding company, called La Maison Younan, which specializes in the acquisition and operation of luxury properties, products and services. This prompted the company to expand into private equity firm Younan Company, with assets under management including El Septimo Premium Cigars headquartered in Geneva, Switzerland, 7 Global Distribution Tobacco Wholesale, and MPA Studio de Création headquartered in Paris, France. Most recently the company entered the Wine & Spirits sector, with two Saint-Émilion Grand Cru Vineyards, Chateau la Croix Younan and Chateau Zaya, as well as El Septimo Cognac. The company also owns luxury hotels and resorts in France and Portugal, including Château de Beauvois, Hôtel Saint-Martin, Château Le Prieuré, Alexandra Palace, Domaine de Vaugouard, and Château de la Perrière, as well as Malibu Foz Hotel and Beach Resort located in Figueira da Foz, Portugal, and four French golf courses including Golf des Forges, Golf du Petit Chêne, Golf d’Avrillé, and Golf de Vaugouard.
