= Tower Petroleum Building =

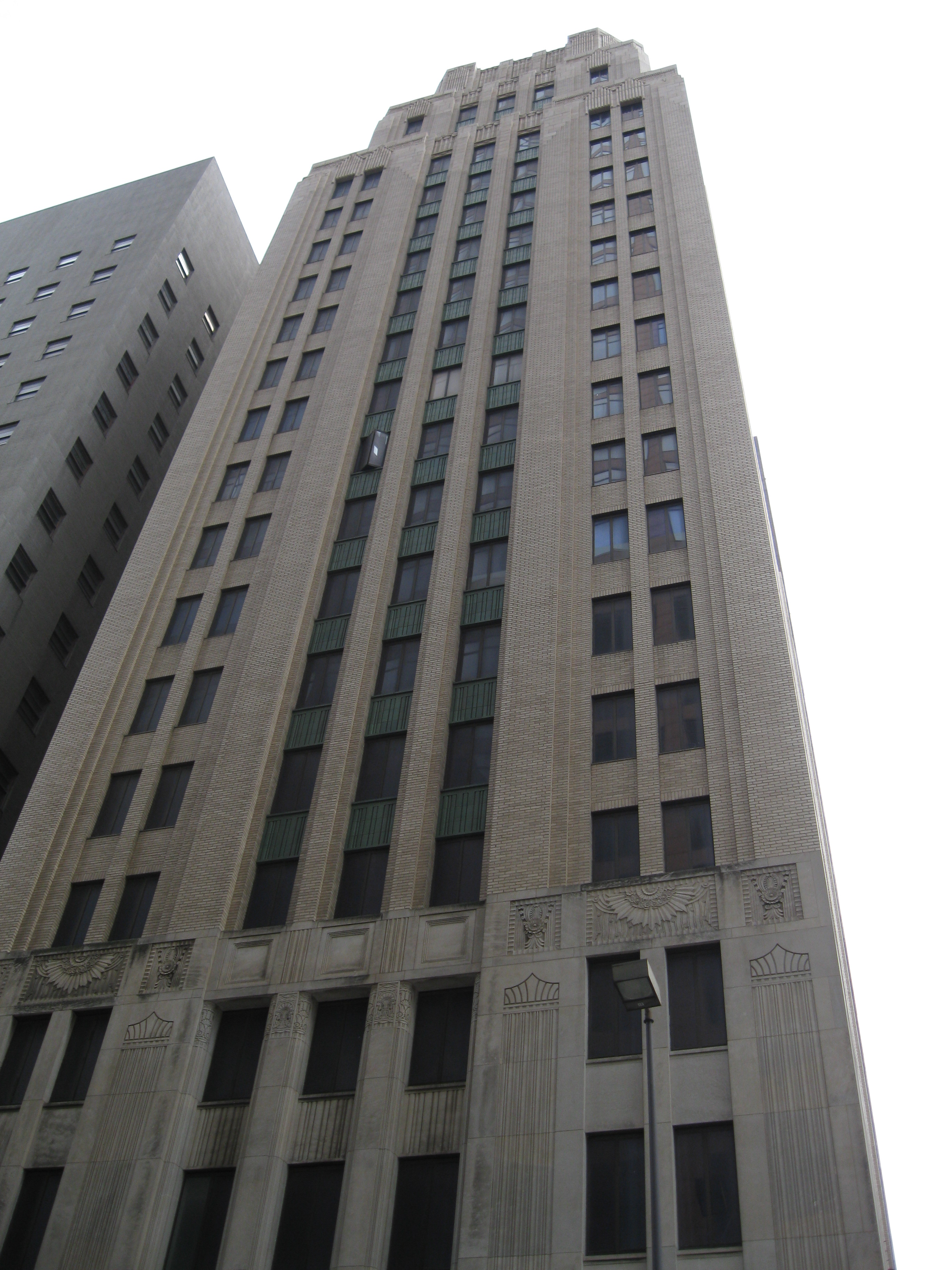
- Tower Petroleum Building in 2009
- Interactive map of the Tower Petroleum Building area

General information
- Status: Completed
- Type: Office
- Architectural style: Zig-Zag Moderne
- Location: 1907 Elm St., Dallas, Texas, United States
- Coordinates: 32°46′51″N 96°47′49″W
- Opening: 1931

Height
- Roof: 315 ft (96 m)

Technical details
- Floor count: 23

Design and construction
- Architect: Mark Lemmon
- Tower Petroleum Building
- U.S. Historic district – Contributing property
- Dallas Landmark Historic District; Contributing Property
- Part of: Dallas Downtown Historic District (ID04000894)
- DLMKHD No.: H/48 (Harwood HD)

Significant dates
- Designated CP: August 11, 2006
- Designated DLMKHD: February 28, 1990

The Renaissance Saint Elm Dallas Downtown Hotel, formerly the historicTower Petroleum Building, is an Art Deco Skyscraper located at 1907 Elm Street in the City Center District of Downtown Dallas. The tower, a contributing property in the Dallas Downtown Historic District and the Harwood Street Historic District, features Zig-zag Moderne styling and was designed by architect Mark Lemmon.

== Design ==
The Tower Petroleum Building features Zig-zag Moderne motifs, one of the few buildings left in Downtown Dallas which features such designs. The building's facade is clad in limestone and has green spandrels panels between the windows. The upper floors of the building are set back twice from the shaft of the building starting with a three-story set back from the 19th floor. At the 22nd floor, the top sets back again and this section is 2 stories in height. These setbacks occur on three sides of the building.

== History ==
The Tower Petroleum Building is located in the city's historic entertainment district, Theater Row; the adjacent Majestic Theatre is the only surviving theater. At one time, the Tower Theater was located behind the building and the lobby to that theater was located inside the office building. In 1951, the Corrigan Tower was constructed over and around the Tower Theater.

The Federal Bureau of Investigation had offices on the 12th floor of the Tower Petroleum Building from 1937 to 1943.

In June 2007, the Dallas City Council approved a $15 million plan by a local developer to renovate and convert the Tower Petroleum Building into a luxury high-rise hotel.

Developer John Kirtland renovated the tower at a cost of $52 million, and it reopened as the 177-room Renaissance Saint Elm Dallas Downtown Hotel in February 2022.

== See also ==
- Eliel Saarinen's Tribune Tower design
- National Register of Historic Places listings in Dallas County, Texas
- List of Dallas Landmarks
