= City Center District, Dallas =

Neighborhood in Dallas, Texas

Coordinates: 32.78549°N 96.79638°W

City Center District
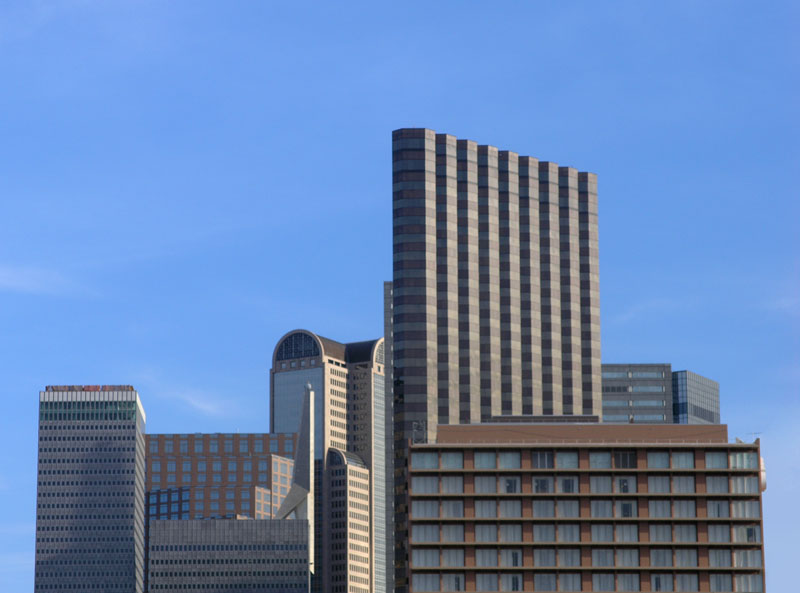
- The majority of these buildings are within the City Center District

- Location in Dallas
- Country: United States
- State: Texas
- Counties: Dallas
- City: Dallas
- Area: Downtown
- Elevation: 460 ft (140 m)
- ZIP code: 75201, 75202
- Area codes: 214, 469, 972

The City Center District is an area in north-central downtown Dallas, Texas, US. It lies south of the Arts District, north of the Main Street District, northwest of Deep Ellum, southwest of Bryan Place and east of the West End Historic District. The district contains a large concentration of downtown commercial space which prior to 1950 had been concentrated along Main Street. The district also contains remnants of Theatre Row, the historical entertainment area along Elm Street which contained theatres such as the Majestic Theatre.

== Notable structures and parks ==
- 2100 Ross Avenue
- Sheraton Dallas Hotel
- Bryan Tower
- The Drever
- Energy Plaza
- Fidelity Union Tower
- Republic Center
- Harwood Center
- JPMorgan Chase Tower
- KPMG Centre
- Majestic Theatre
- Patriot Tower
- Plaza of the Americas
- Renaissance Tower
- Ross Tower
- Thanksgiving Tower
- U.S. Post Office
- Corrigan Tower
- 211 North Ervay
- 505 North Ervay
- Hartford Building
- Thanks-Giving Square
- Aston Park

== Transportation ==
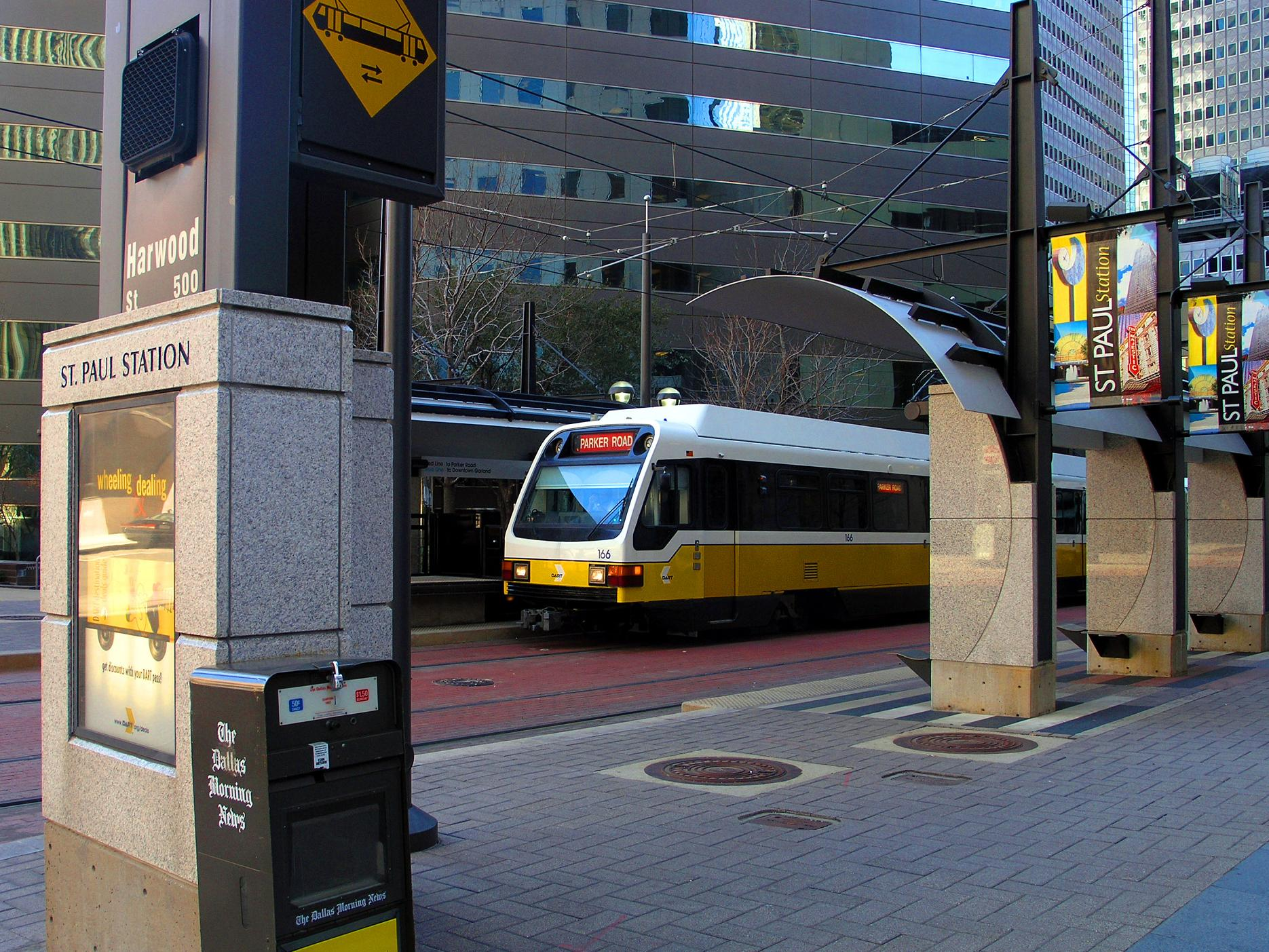
St. Paul Station

=== Highways ===
- US 75 Central Expressway/ I-45 connection (unsigned I-345)

=== Streetcars ===
- MATA: M-Line Trolley

The M-Line Trolley is a heritage streetcar that provides service between Cityplace/Uptown station in Uptown and St Paul station in Downtown. Service is free.
The M-Line features 40 dedicated stops serving key destinations including: the West Village, McKinney Avenue, Klyde Warren Park, the Dallas Arts District, four historical cemeteries, and the State Thomas historic neighborhood.

=== Trains ===
- DART Blue Line, Red Line, Green Line, Orange Line (listed south to north)
  - Akard Station
  - St. Paul Station
  - Pearl/Arts District Station

== Education ==
First Baptist Academy Downtown Campus

The City Center District is served by the Dallas Independent School District.

The neighborhood schools for downtown are outside of the loop.

Four elementary schools—City Park, Sam Houston, Hope Medrano, and Ignacio Zaragoza; three middle schools—Billy Earl Dade, Thomas J. Rusk, and Alex W. Spence; and two high schools—James Madison and North Dallas, serve the district.

Private Schools

Holy Trinity Catholic School has served Dallas' central neighborhoods since 1914 and is located at the corner of Oak Lawn Avenue and Gilbert Avenue. Providing early education for three-year-olds through eighth grade, Holy Trinity is the oldest continually operating Catholic school in North Texas.

Residents are also served by First Baptist Academy of Dallas, a Biblically-integrated, college preparatory K-12 school located in the city center district of downtown Dallas.
