= First National Bank Tower (Dallas) =

Skyscraper in Dallas, Texas, U.S.

The National
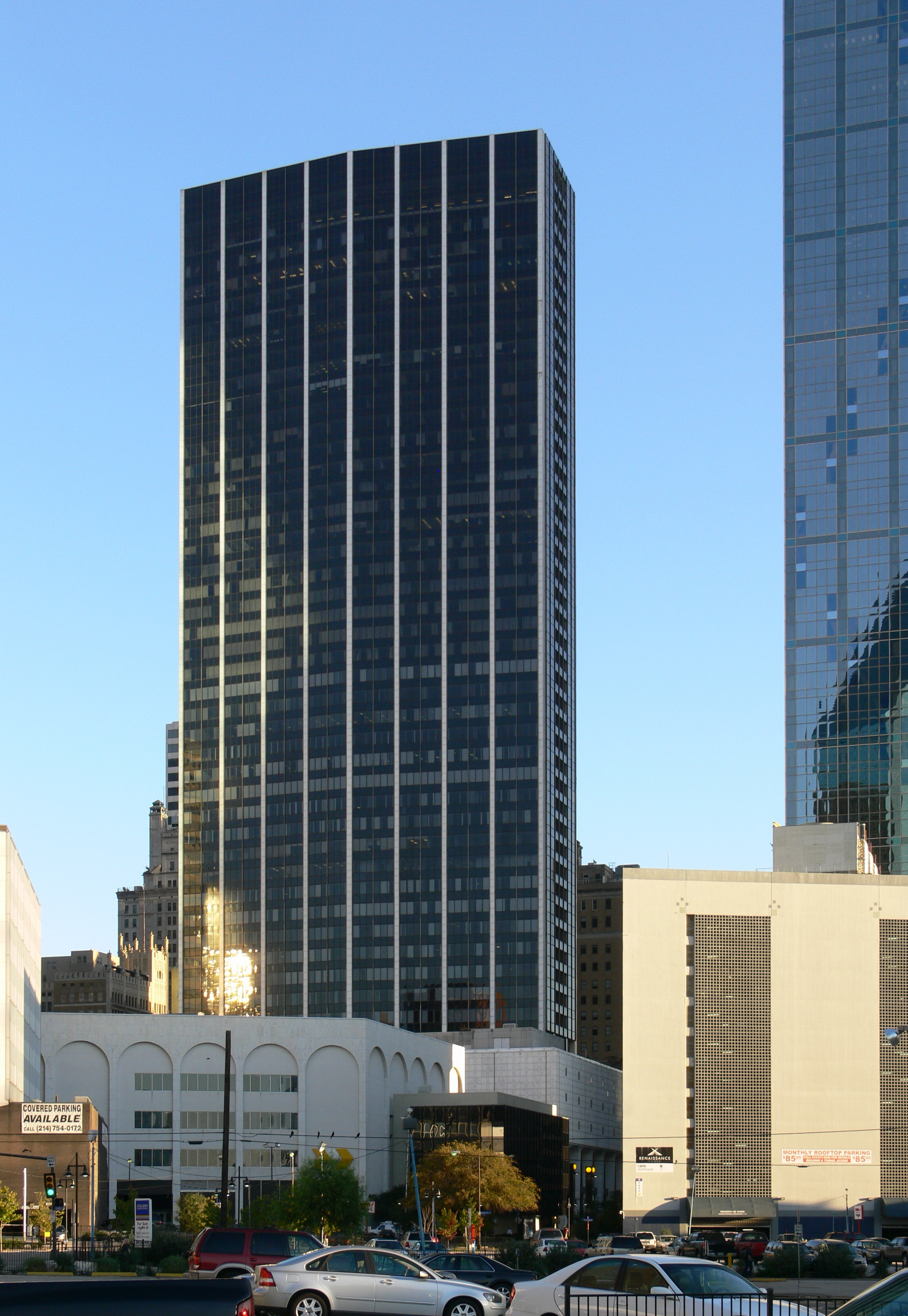
- The National in 2009
- Former names: First National Bank Tower

General information
- Status: Completed
- Type: Hotel, residential Commercial (former)
- Architectural style: International style
- Location: 1401 Elm St., Dallas, Texas, United States
- Coordinates: 32°46′53″N 96°48′03″W
- Completed: 1965
- Cost: US$35 million
- Owner: Starwood Capital Group

Height
- Roof: 627 ft (191 m)

Technical details
- Floor count: 50
- Floor area: 1,399,986 sq ft (130,063.0 m^{2})
- Lifts/elevators: 27

Design and construction
- Architects: George Dahl; Thomas E. Stanley
- Developer: First National Bank of Dallas
- Main contractor: Robert E. McKee, Inc., Henry C. Beck Co.

Website
- www.thenationaldallas.com
- The National
- U.S. National Register of Historic Places
- NRHP reference No.: 100001764
- Added to NRHP: October 27, 2017

The National is a 50-story, 627-foot (191 m) skyscraper in the Main Street district of downtown Dallas, Texas, United States. Designed by George Dahl and Thomas E. Stanley, it is adjacent to the Dallas Area Rapid Transit (DART) Akard Station. It is the tenth tallest building in the city. In January 2010 the building was closed due to low occupancy rates. It was listed on the National Register of Historic Places in 2017.

In 2020, it reopened, after the most costly building conversion in Dallas' history, totaling $460 million. It contains The luxury Thompson Dallas Hotel, 324 apartments, 37,000 sq ft (3,400 m^{2}) of office space and 43,000 sq ft (4,000 m^{2}) of retail space.

== History ==
The $35 million skyscraper was designed for the First National Bank in Dallas by architects George Dahl and Thomas E. Stanley, built to replace First National's home on Main Street. It originally was proposed to be 96 feet (29 m) higher, but was scaled back after determining it would be a hazard to flights leaving Dallas Love Field. By choosing a site with lower elevation, the tower, even with a modified height, was still taller than rival bank's Republic Center. The 2-acre (0.81 ha) block of land previously contained First National's motor bank, which was demolished for the new structure. The exterior, featuring a dark and light contrasting theme, was clad in more than 8 acres (3.2 ha) of dark gray glass and white marble imported from Greece. The building's construction began in 1961 and used more than 25,000 tons of steel. Construction was handled jointly by Robert E. McKee, Inc. and Henry C. Beck Co. At the time of opening in 1965, it was the tallest building west of the Mississippi River, until surpassed by 555 California Street in San Francisco in 1969. It was the tallest in Texas until 1971, when One Shell Plaza was built in Houston. In 1974, Renaissance Tower became the tallest in Dallas.

The 225-foot-long (69 m) tower that rises out of this base was placed off center and is a modified hexagon, with four of the sides only slightly angled [end walls are 75 feet (23 m) wide with a midpoint width of 95 feet (29 m)]. Floors 11-49 were general lease space not used by First National Bank. The white columns running up the tower contain Plexiglas mullions that house fluorescent lights, which were once turned on every night. The Observation Terrace on the 50th floor contained the world's highest escalator from the 49th floor.

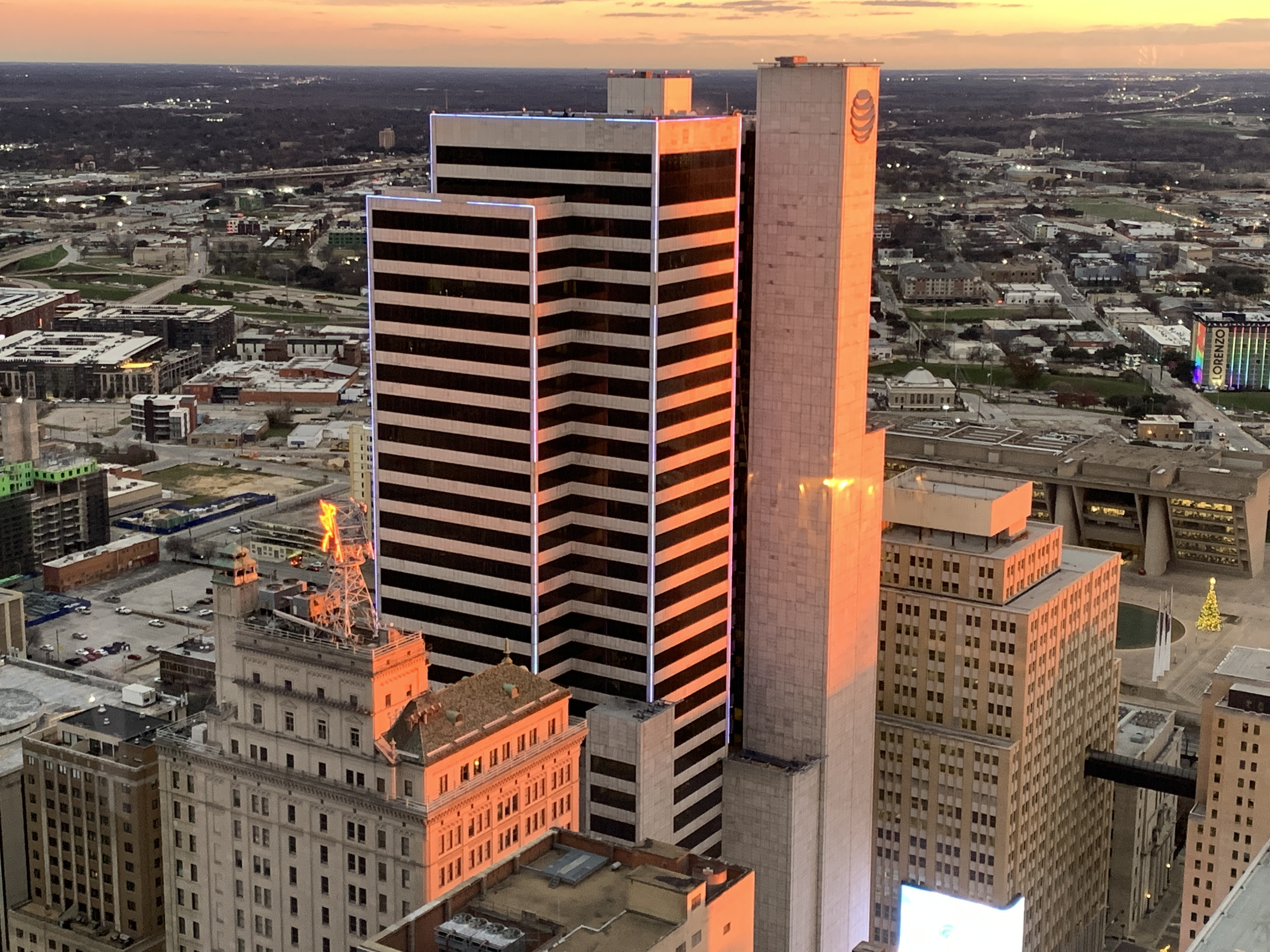
View from the 49th floor of the National building in the Monarch restaurant

At ground level the building features a long pedestrian arcade flanked by retail space connected Elm Street and Pacific Street, and the building was later connected to the Dallas Pedestrian Network when the adjacent Renaissance Tower was opened in 1974. An 800-space garage was located on the lower two levels, and was the largest single parking facility in Dallas at the time.

During following years the bank continued to grow and under InterFirst Corp. built Renaissance Tower and Bank of America Plaza. After a series of mergers it became part of Bank of America, and as most banking operations vacated the structure the name was changed to Elm Place. Under a special agreement, the bank owned the bottom 10 floors, while the lobby and upper 42 floors had a separate owner. The lower floors of the building were foreclosed on in early 2009; the tower portion of the building closed in late January 2010 due to low occupancy rates. In May 2010 the building was put up for sale for $19 million.

In 2020, it reopened, after the most costly building conversion in Dallas' history, totaling $460 million. It contains The luxury Thompson Dallas Hotel, 324 apartments, 37,000 square feet (3,400 m^{2}) sq ft of office space and 43,000 square feet (4,000 m^{2}) of retail space.

In January 2026, the building went into foreclosure, and developer Shawn Todd turned the property over to its lender, Starwood Capital Group, which was owed $230 million.

=== Banking facilities ===
The building's eight story base, which contained the banking and operational function for First National Bank, covered the entire block and featured a continuous set of 48-foot-high (15 m) marble arches on all sides of the building. The lower five floors of the base were recessed 10 feet (3 m) to provide large walkways around the building. The floors above the arches (6,7 and 8) do not have any windows and are covered in marble.

The 13,860 sq ft (1,288 m^{2}) main banking floor, located on the 4th floor, was 2 stories in height and contained the vaults and 50 teller stations. Two motor banks served customers: a "walk-up" bank on Elm Street for pedestrians and a "drive-in" bank on Pacific Street.

The second floor contained the "Money Tree", a 20-foot-wide (6.1 m) mural designed by Alma Shon made of 8,500 coins and carved wood.

The ninth floor, the first floor of the tower, housed the bank's top executives, lounge areas and executive dining room. It was surrounded by an extensive rooftop garden, heavily landscaped and filled with sculptures and fountains. The 8th floor contained the Dallas Room, a 300-seat auditorium, and the bank employees' cafeteria.

== Gallery ==
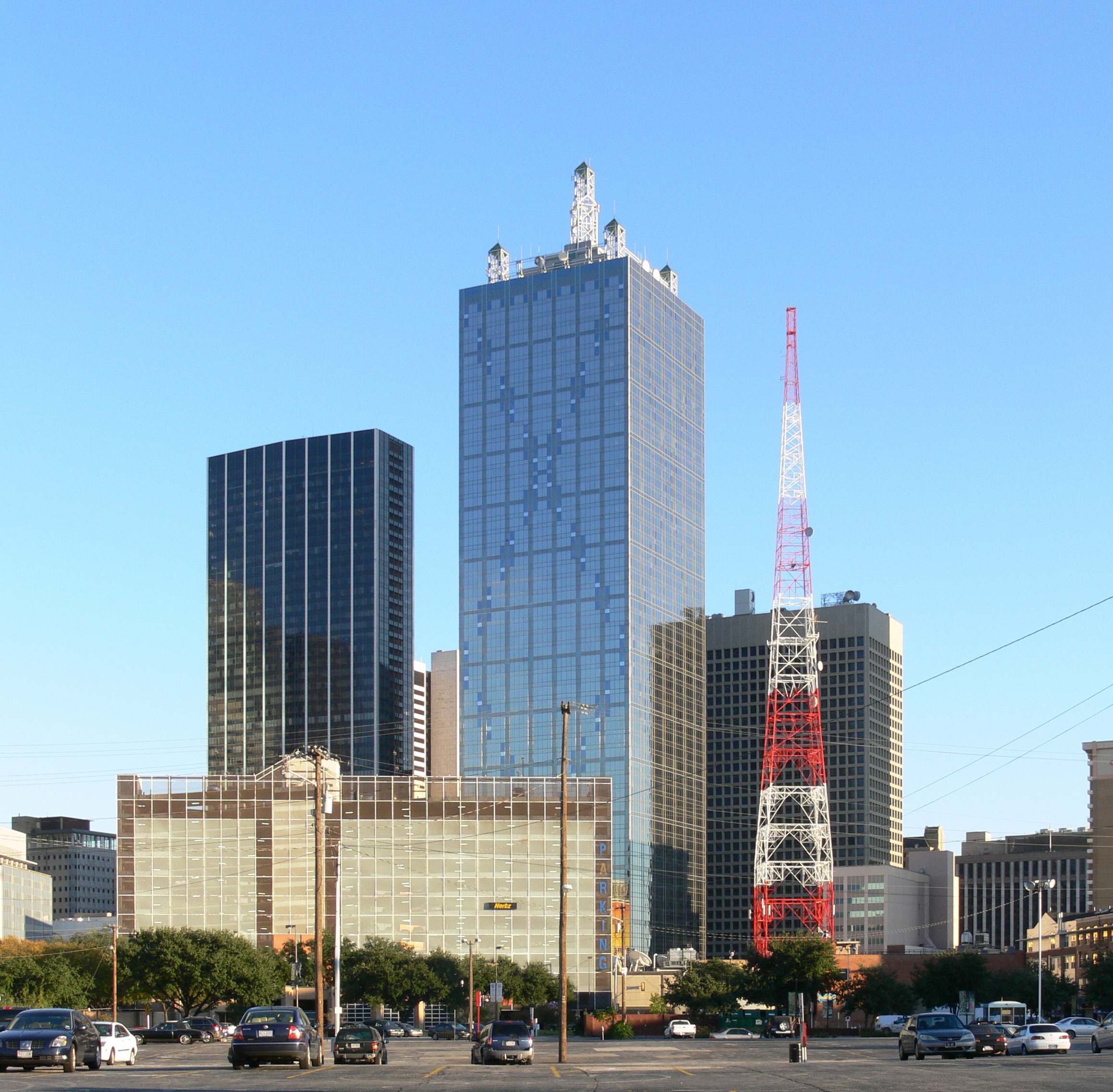

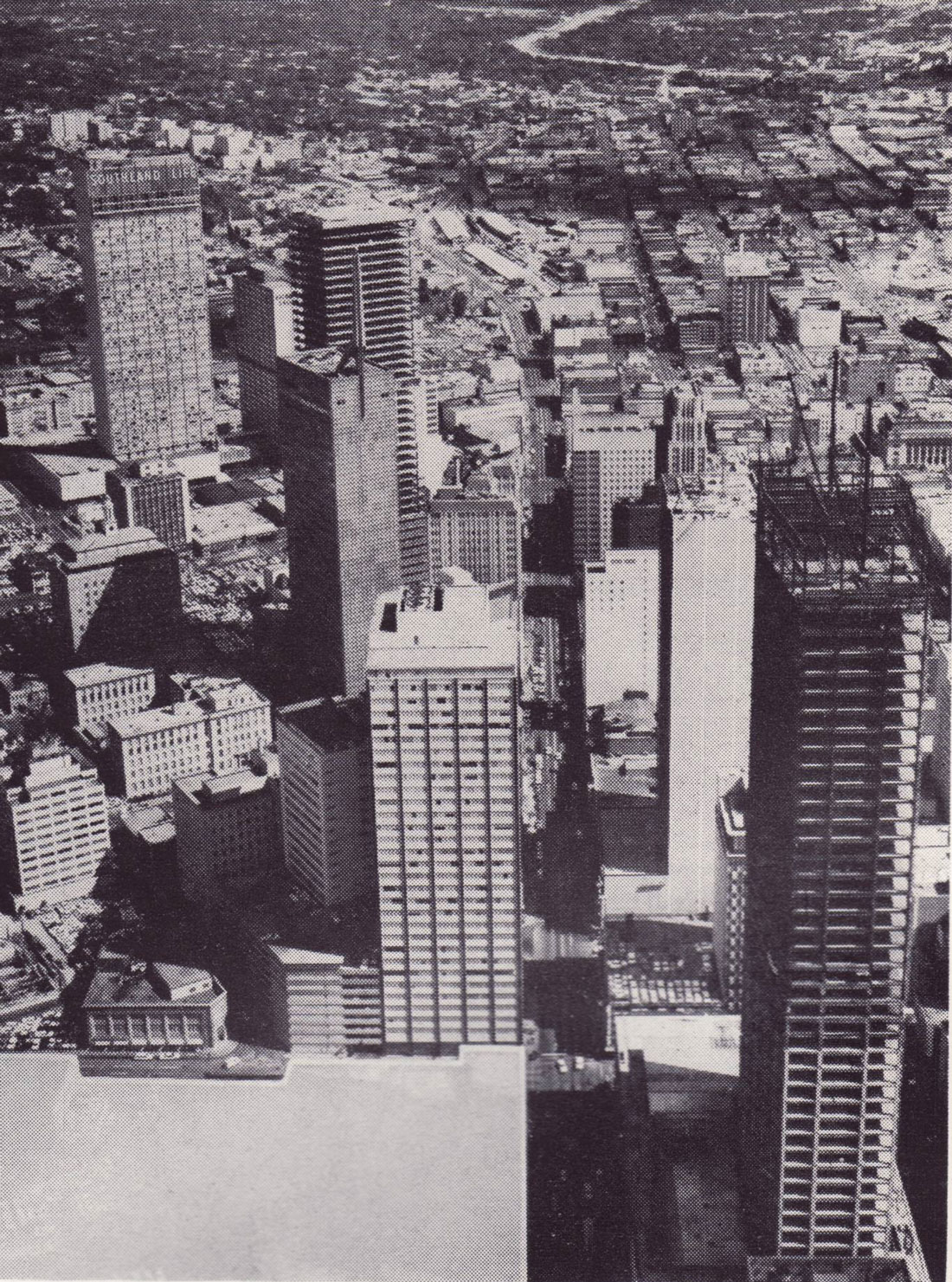

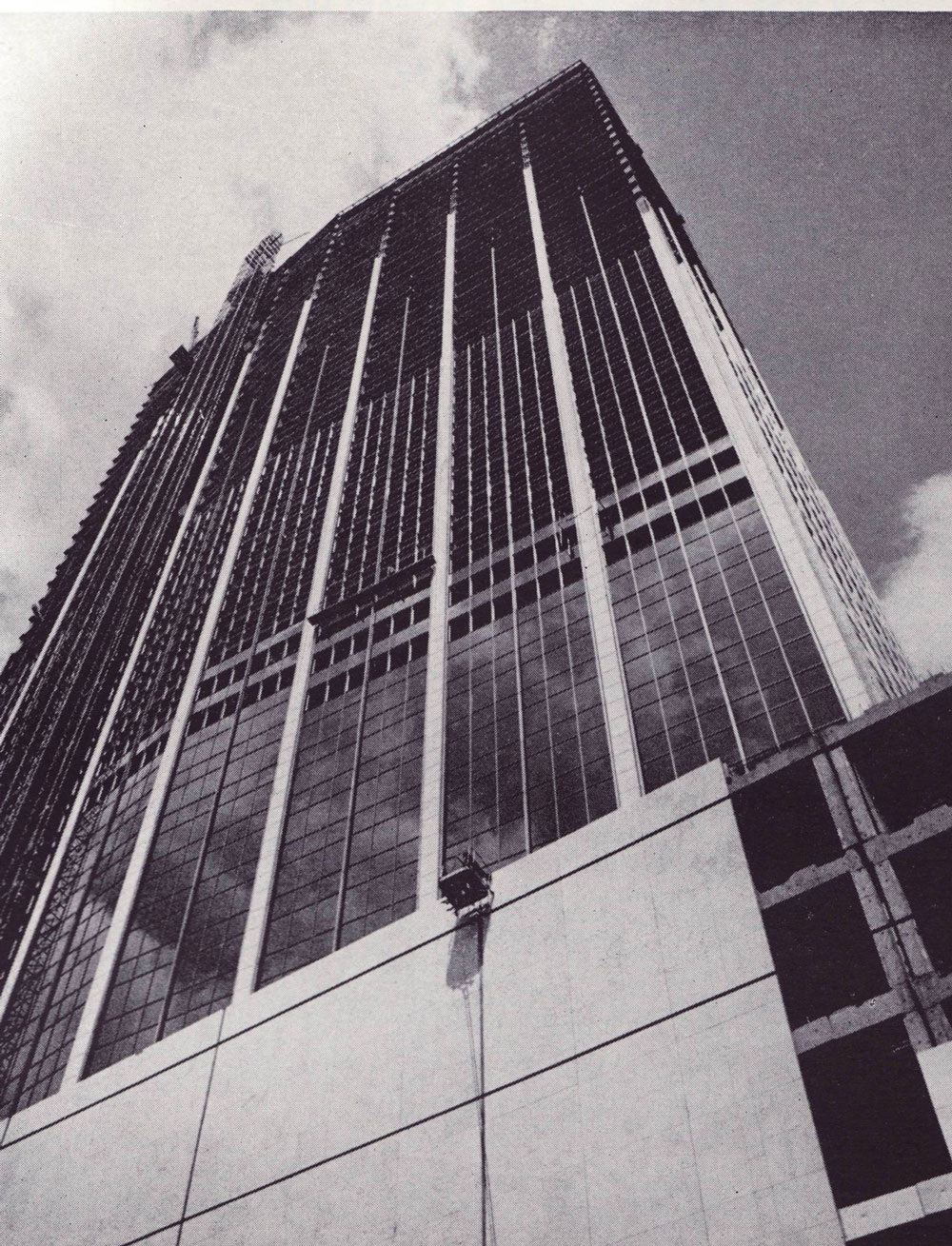

== See also ==
- National Register of Historic Places listings in Dallas County, Texas
- List of tallest buildings in Dallas
- List of tallest buildings in Texas

Records
Preceded by ExxonMobil Building	Tallest building in the United States west of Mississippi River; 1965–1969	Succeeded by 555 California Street
