= Republic Center =

Commercial building in Dallas, Texas, U.S.

- Republic National Bank
- U.S. National Register of Historic Places
- U.S. Historic district – Contributing property
- Dallas Landmark
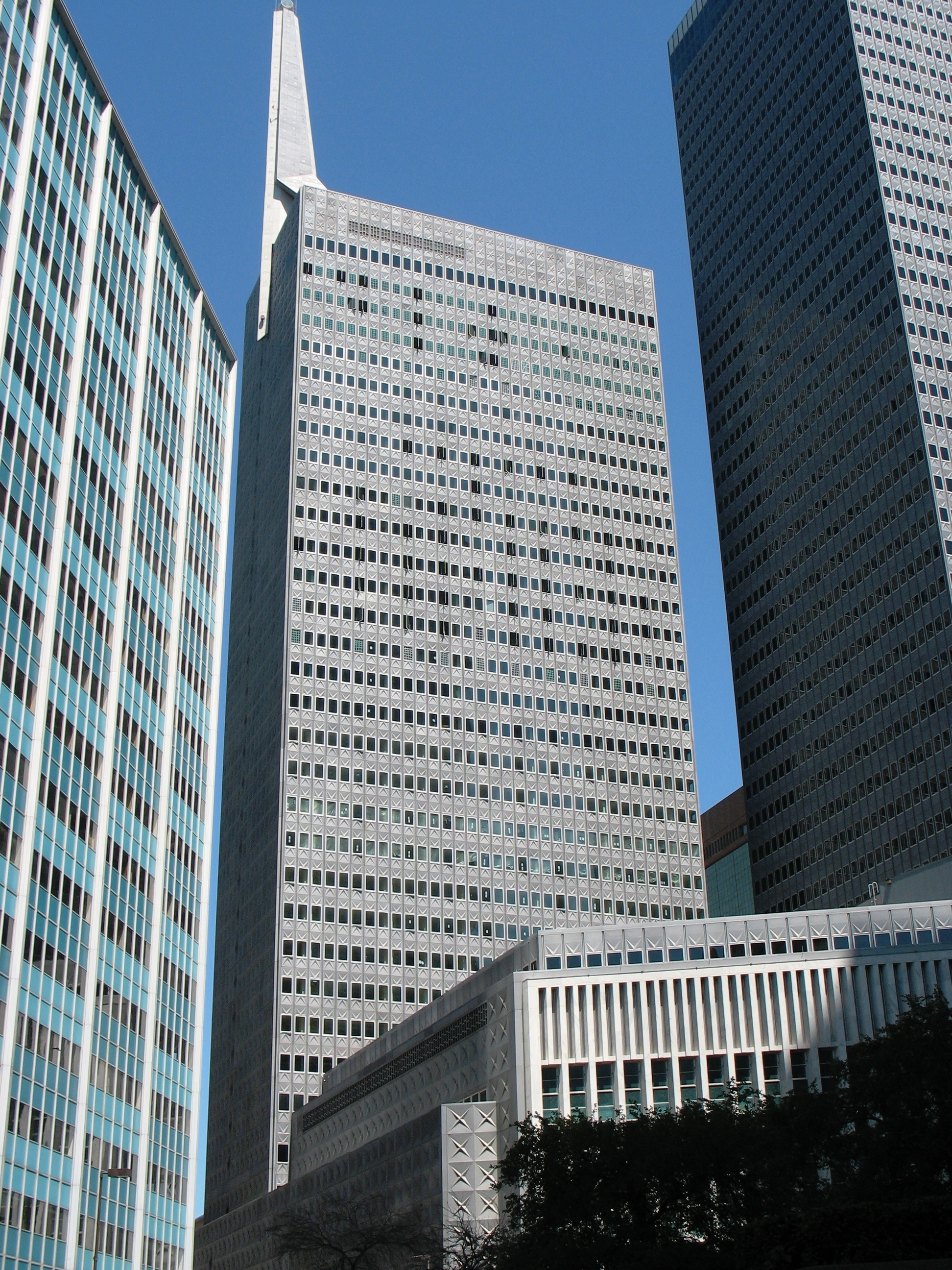
- Republic Tower I in 2007

- Location within Texas Location within the United States
- Location: 300 N. Ervay St./325 N. St. Paul St., Dallas, Texas, U.S.
- Coordinates: 32°47′56″N 96°47′51″W
- Area: 1.4 acres (0.57 ha)
- Built: 1954
- Architects: Harrison and Abramovitz, et al.
- Architectural style: Modern architecture Height = 602 ft (183 m)
- Website: republiccenter.com/home.html
- Part of: Dallas Downtown Historic District (ID04000894)
- NRHP reference No.: 05000243
- DLMK No.: H/117 (Tower I)

Significant dates
- Added to NRHP: March 31, 2005
- Designated CP: August 11, 2006
- Designated DLMK: April 14, 2004

Republic Center is a mixed-use complex at 300 N. Ervay Street and 325 N. St. Paul Street in the City Center District of downtown Dallas, Texas, United States, adjacent to Thanks-giving Square. The complex is located diagonally across the street from DART's St. Paul Station, which serves its Blue, Red, Orange, and Green light rail lines. It also contains part of the Dallas Pedestrian Network, with shops and restaurants in the lower levels of the building and is connected to the Bullington Truck Terminal.

== History ==
The Republic National Bank Building (later known as Republic Center Tower I and now Gables Republic Tower) was constructed as a 36-story skyscraper for the headquarters of Republic National Bank, which had previously been located at the Davis Building. Seeking to build higher than their rival's Mercantile National Bank Building, the 602 ft (183 m) tall Republic National Bank Building became the tallest building in Dallas and west of the Mississippi River at its completion in 1954. The skyscraper included an elaborate banking pavilion that stretched to Pacific Avenue. It remained the tallest building on the Dallas skyline until it was surpassed by the First National Bank Tower in 1965.

As the bank expanded, in 1964 it sought to reclaim the tallest-in-Dallas title. The bank hired architects Harrell & Hamilton to achieve this by designing a taller companion to adjacent Republic Center I. However, height limit was restricted by the FAA. Upon completion in 1964, Republic Center Tower II was only tallest-in-Dallas on some lists. The 150-foot (46 m) spire on the original 1954 Republic Center gave that structure a 4-foot (1.2 m) edge in terms of spire height. Less than a year later, the building was surpassed by Elm Place as the tallest building in Dallas.

Republic Center Tower III, an 8-story building with a Dallas Pedestrian Network retail concourse below, was added in 1980. It replaced the historic 20-story Medical Arts Building which was razed in 1978. With the completion of the third phase, the Republic Center consisted of an entire city block bounded by Ervay, Bryan, St. Paul and Pacific Streets.

In 1985 RepublicBank Corp., now one of the largest banks in the Southwest, announced plans to construct a 60-story, 1,400,000-square-foot (130,000 m^{2}) building across the street on land now designated for Pacific Plaza Park. Plans were terminated in 1987 when rival InterFirst Corp. acquired the company, and Republic Center lost most of its tenants during the ensuing savings and loan crisis of the 1980s.

The building complex was listed on the National Register of Historic Places in 2005.

=== Renovation ===
In 1997 new owners acquired the block and the complex was renovated. Republic Center Tower I was renovated in 2005 to house 229 residential units. The first units opened in January 2007 and the building's name changed to Gables Republic Tower. Republic Center Towers II & III remain active office buildings, while the old banking lobbies and ground floors are leased as office and retail space.

== Architecture and design ==
The complex is a prime example of mid century modern skyscraper design. The buildings are clad in interlocking aluminum plates which incorporate Republic National Bank's four-pointed star symbol. The building was designed by architects Harrison & Abramovitz, who in 1953 had just completed the thirty story Alcoa Building in Pittsburgh. The design of Republic Center integrated the use of aluminum with a structural steel frame resulting in a lighter and energy efficient building.

The banking lobby featured new techniques in engineering to create a column-free lobby where upper floors had to be hung from above. The lobby was finished with exquisite marble, inlaid wood and 3,000 square feet (280 m^{2}) of pure gold leaf. Also incorporated within the building were innovations such as underground drive-through banking and valet parking. The elevators inside the complex speed at a rate of 1,400 feet (430 m) a minute, making them among the fastest in the nation.

At the time of completion, the spire atop Gables Republic Tower (an abstraction of the four-pointed star and referred to as the "rocket") contained a rotating beacon of light. This was later turned off due to taller surrounding buildings, but today the spire is floodlit from below.

The following words by Karl Hoblitzelle, chairman of the board for Republic National Bank from 1945 to 1965, are set in bronze at the Ervay Street entrance:

"This building is dedicated to the principle that no institution can long endure unless it serves faithfully and unselfishly its country, its state and community."

=== Rank in the Dallas skyline ===
Gables Republic Tower is 36-stories and has a roof height of 452 feet (138 m), but when its 150-foot (46 m) spire is included, the building reaches a height of 602 feet (183 m). Currently, it is the 11th-tallest building in the city when the spire is included. Without the spire, it is the 21st-tallest.

Republic Center Tower II is 50-stories and has a roof height of 598 feet (182 m), making it the 11th-tallest building in Dallas by roof-height (the building is 12th-tallest with regards to adjacent Gables Republic Tower's spire).

== Gallery ==
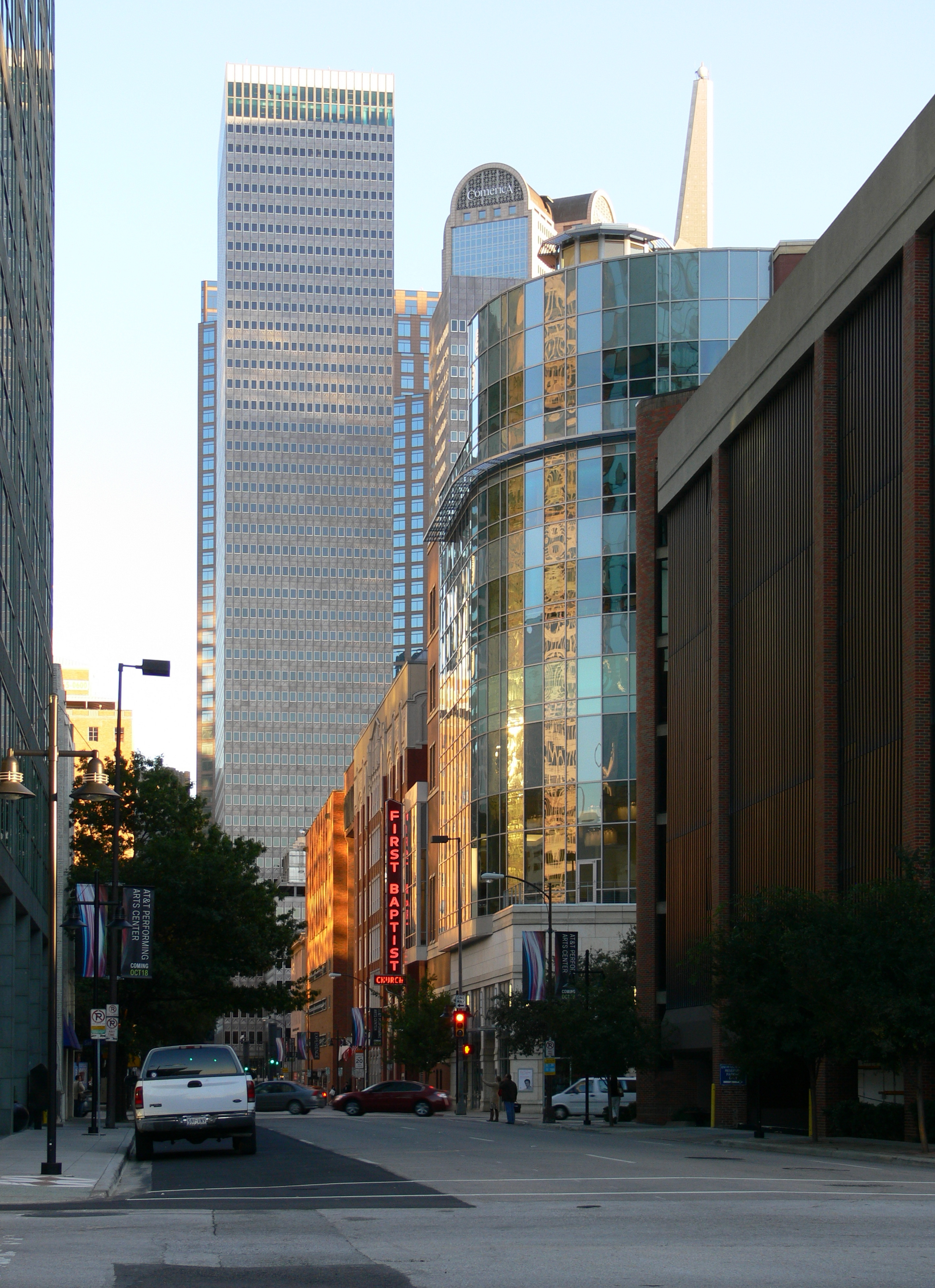
South view on St. Paul Street

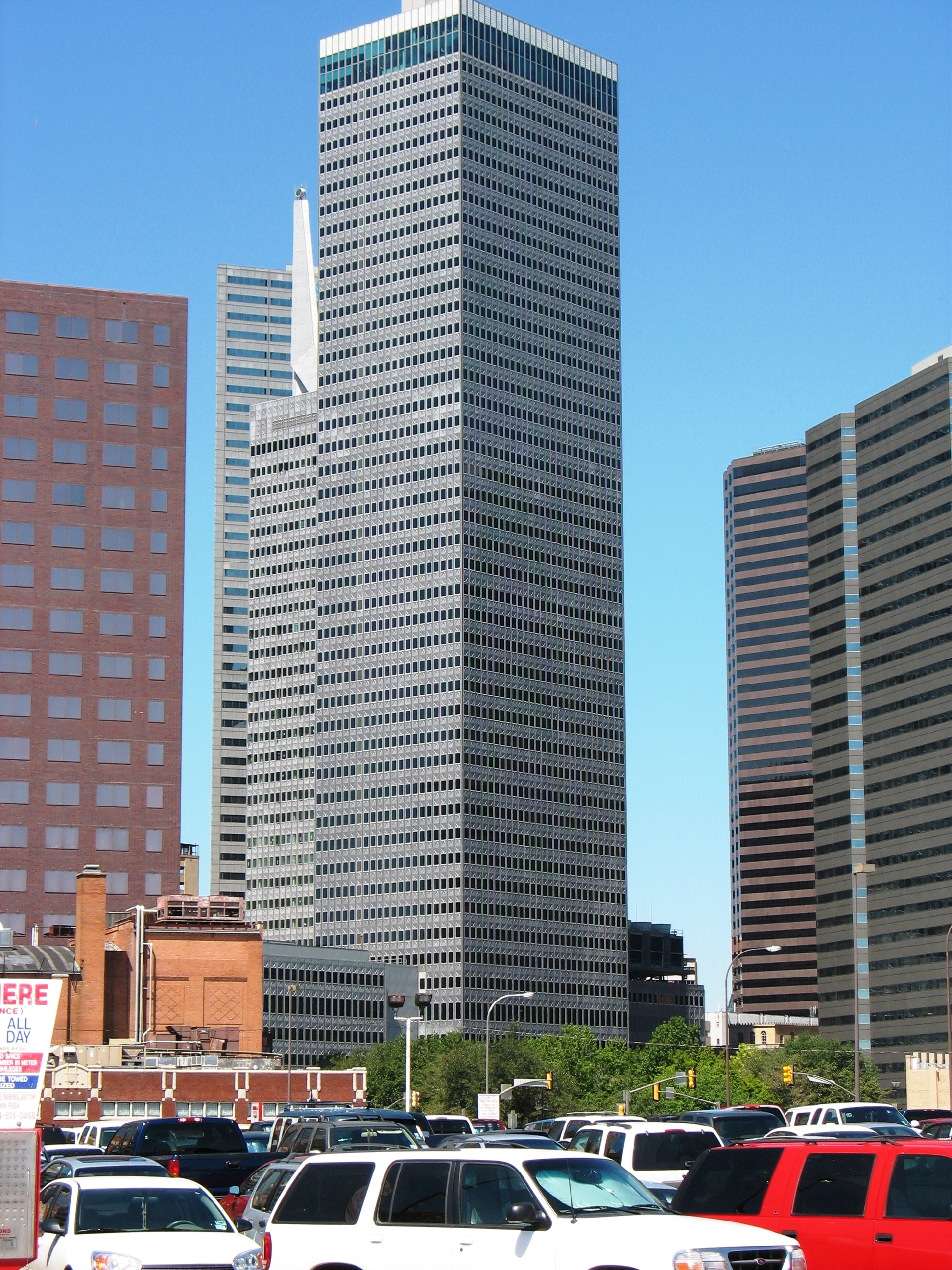
Southeast View

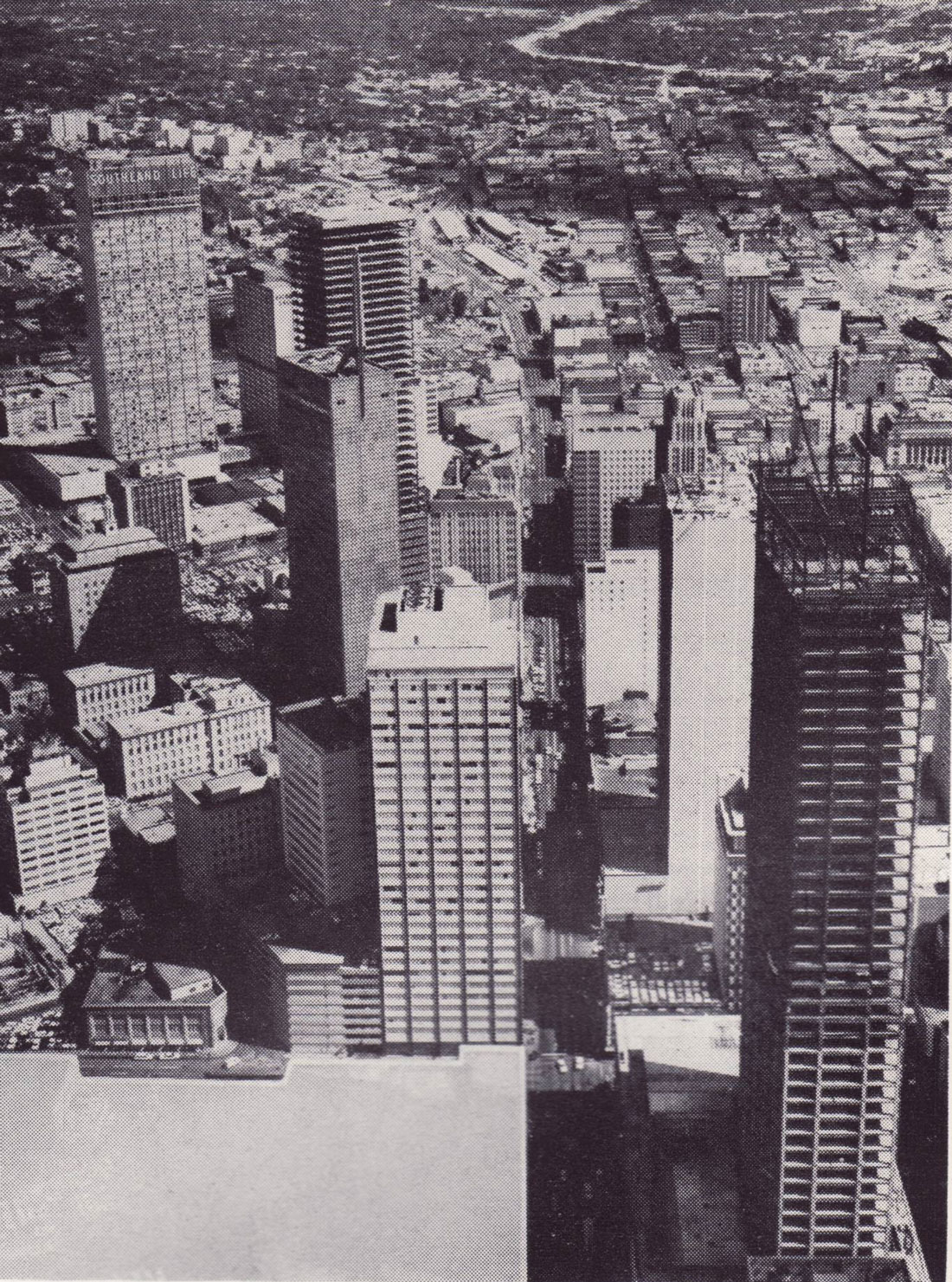
Republic Center II and Elm Place both under construction

== See also ==
- List of tallest buildings in Dallas
- National Register of Historic Places listings in Dallas County, Texas
- List of Dallas Landmarks
