= Harwood Center =

Skyscraper in Dallas Texas

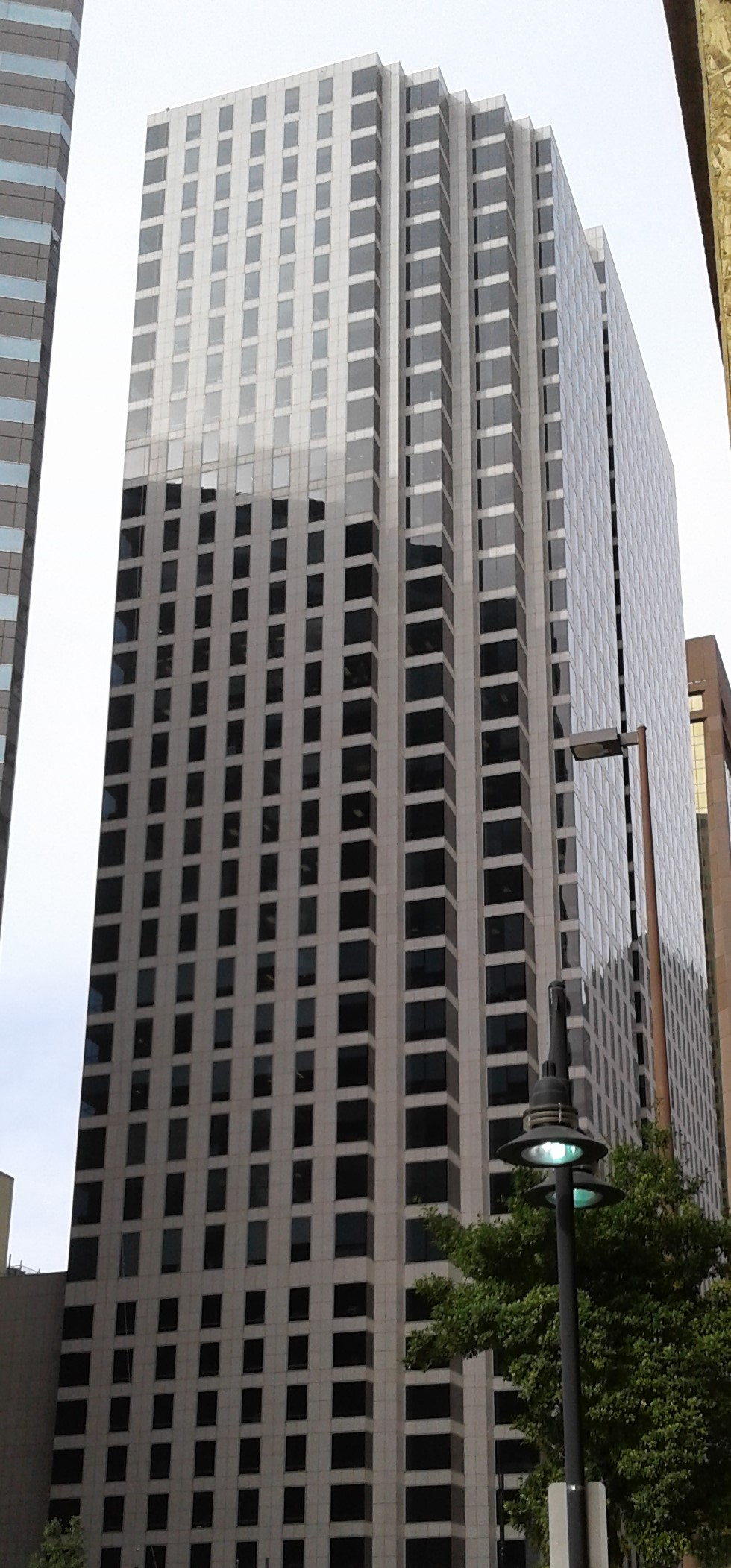
- The Harwood Center building in 2018
- Interactive map of the Harwood Center area

General information
- Status: Completed
- Type: Office
- Location: 1999 Bryan Street, Dallas, Texas, United States
- Coordinates: 32.785°N 96.797°W
- Opening: 1982

Height
- Roof: 483 ft (147 m)

Technical details
- Floor count: 36

Design and construction
- Architect: WZMH Architects
- Developer: Trammell Crow

The Harwood Center is an American skyscraper at 1999 Bryan Street in Dallas, Texas. The building rises 483 feet (147 m). It contains 36 floors, and was completed in 1982. Harwood Center currently stands as the 21st-tallest building in the city. The architectural firm who designed the building was WZMH Architects, the firm who designed the CN Tower in Toronto.

== History ==
Originally named the Olympia & York Tower after its Toronto-based developer Olympia & York Developments Ltd., the 780,000-square-foot (72,000 m^{2}) skyscraper is fronted with gray-white granite and single-pane black windows. Two of the corners are serrated to provide more corner offices. The building design features what looks like two separate connected towers. One is 34 stories and the other 36, with a vertical indention separating them, and a parking garage is built into the lower levels.

Notably, the building was built over Federal Street which runs through a tunnel on the lower floors. The tower was built adjacent to the historic Dallas Cotton Exchange Building, which was demolished in 1994.

== Foreclosure ==
In 1993 the Olympia & York Tower joined two other prominent downtown skyscrapers in foreclosure, the 50-story First City Center on Elm Street (now 1700 Pacific) and the 50-story Trammell Crow Center on Ross Avenue (formerly LTV Center), following the savings and loan crisis of the late '80s and early '90s. Longtime real estate brokers said it was the first time that so many prominent downtown office towers had been posted for foreclosure. According to the foreclosure posting documents, the developers had defaulted on an $86.6 million loan held by Swiss Bank Corp. It was appraised on the Dallas County tax rolls at $66.4 million.

== Improvements ==
On June 14, 1996, Dallas Area Rapid Transit began light rail service along its downtown Dallas transit mall, simultaneously closing Bryan Street (from Pacific Ave. to N. Pearl St.) to automobile traffic. The transit system's St. Paul Station is directly outside the Harwood Center entrance and is the closest station serving the emerging Dallas Arts District.

On July 8, 2010 the Obama administration announced it had awarded $4.9 million to the McKinney Avenue Transit Authority in order to extend its popular Uptown streetcar line south into downtown Dallas. The new alignment will connect the current track on St. Paul St. to new track on Olive St. via Federal St., which runs underneath Harwood Center. As such, the entire DART rail system will be connected to the MATA streetcar via the short transfer at Harwood Center. The extension is expected to be complete in 2013.

On May 20, 2011, Fortis Property Group of New York announced it had restructured the debt on the tower, allowing it to spend $6 million for capital improvements and about $10 million in leasing and tenant space improvement. Work is set to be finished by the end of 2012.

== Tenants ==
Tenants include the headquarters of Jacobs Engineering Group, as well as the federal government, Omnicom Group, and Fireman's Fund Insurance Company.

== See also ==
- List of tallest buildings and structures in Dallas
