= Victory Tower (Dallas) =

Canceled skyscraper in Dallas, Texas

Coordinates: 32.788447°N 96.810070°W

- Interactive map of the Victory Tower area

General information
- Status: Never built
- Type: Hotel, Office, Residential
- Location: Victory Park, Dallas, Texas, United States
- Construction started: 2006
- Estimated completion: 2009 (est.)
- Opening: Early 2009 (est.)

Height
- Roof: 650 ft (200 m)

Technical details
- Floor count: 43

Design and construction
- Architect: Kohn Pedersen Fox Associates
- Developer: Mandarin Oriental Hotel Group; Henry Ross Perot, Jr.

The Victory Tower, also referred to as Mandarin Oriental Dallas Hotel & Residences, is a canceled skyscraper in the Victory Park neighborhood of Dallas, Texas. At the time its proposal, the building would have been the tallest structure under construction in the city, and was the only building planned to rise over 400 feet (120 meters) up for proposal in Dallas. Upon completion, the Victory Tower would stand as the 8th-tallest building in the city, rising to a height of 650 feet (200 m) with 43 floors.

== History ==
The Victory Tower's official groundbreaking took place in late 2006, with construction underway by early 2007. The tower, designed by the New York City-based Kohn Pedersen Fox architectural firm, was originally proposed as the centerpiece building project of the new Victory Park development in Dallas, along with one other skyscraper. The other tower, One Victory Tower, was planned to rise 633 feet (193 m) and 40 floors on the lot adjacent to the Victory Tower. However, the project was not approved by the city, and was subsequently canceled. According to an unnamed source at Hillwood Development, the Victory Tower project has been placed "on hold until 2011" as of March 13, 2008. The construction crane has been dismantled and removed. The construction fence has been whitewashed, covering all evidence of the Mandarin Oriental Hotel and Tower project.

== Height ==
Upon completion, the Victory Tower would have risen 650 feet (200 m), surpassing the Thanksgiving Tower to become the 8th-tallest structure in the city. The building was planned to consist of a Mandarin Oriental hotel and commercial offices on its lower floors, with only the upper floors serving as residential condominiums, so it would not have been the tallest all-residential building in the city, a record held by Republic Center Tower I. It would, however, have broken the record for the highest residence in the city, surpassing both Republic Center Tower I and the proposed Museum Tower. Furthermore, upon completion, the Victory Tower would have been the tallest building in the new Victory Park neighborhood of Dallas, surpassing the 440-foot (130 m) W Dallas Victory Hotel and Residences.

== Features ==
The Victory Tower would have been one of the tallest mixed-use buildings in Texas upon completion, housing a Mandarin Oriental hotel, residential condominiums, office space, commercial retail levels, six restaurants, and a spa. Mandarin Oriental would have been the primary tenant of the building, occupying the lowest eleven stories of the tower with a 120-room hotel and the building's upper 21 floors with 91 Mandarin Oriental-branded residences. The hotel staterooms would have been among the largest in the city, averaging 750 square feet (70 square metres) each. On the lower levels, the tower would have also contained 275,000 square feet (25,500 square metres) of commercial office space and a luxury 75,000 square feet (7,000 square metres) retail mall.

== See also ==
- List of tallest buildings in Dallas
- List of tallest buildings in Texas
- List of tallest buildings in the United States
