= Plaza of the Americas (Dallas) =

Commercial complex in downtown Dallas

Coordinates: 32.787166°N 96.795441°W

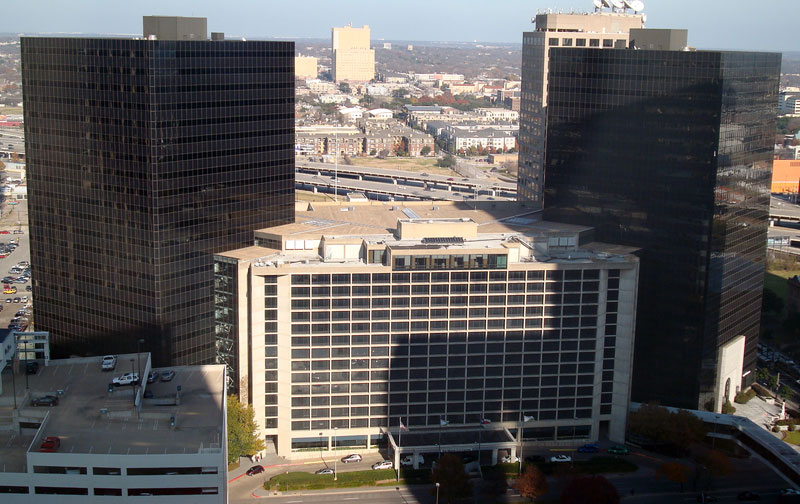
- Plaza of the Americas

General information
- Location: 600-700 N. Pearl, Dallas, Texas, U.S.
- Construction started: 1978
- Completed: 1980
- Cost: $100 million
- Operator: Equity Office Properties

Technical details
- Size: 2,000,000 square feet (190,000 m^{2})

Design and construction
- Architect: Harwood K Smith
- Developer: Wynne/Jackson Inc.
- Main contractor: Henry C Beck Co

Plaza of the Americas is a major commercial complex in the City Center District of downtown Dallas, Texas, United States. It is adjacent to DART's Pearl Station and connected to the Dallas Pedestrian Network. The complex features several amenities connected by an enclosed 120,000 sq ft (11,000 m^{2}). skylighted atrium which rises 13 stories above the lowest level:

- Plaza of the Americas I-South Tower (25-story office tower)
- Plaza of the Americas II-North Tower (25-story office tower)
- Univision Center (26-story office tower)
- 416-room Dallas Marriott City Center (originally the Plaza of the Americas Hotel until 1995, then Le Meridien Dallas until 2003, then The Westin Dallas City Center until 2010)
- 25,000 square feet (2,300 m^{2}) of meeting space
- 2 levels of retail surrounding an indoor park
- 1,000 space parking garage
- 2010 Energy Star

== History ==
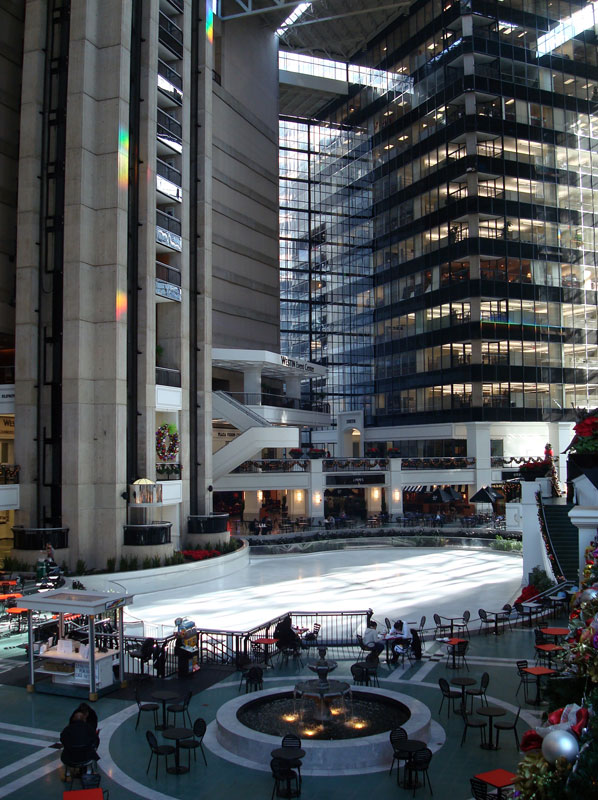
The Atrium of Plaza of the Americas.

The $100 million Plaza of the Americas, announced in 1977, was one of the first mixed-use developments in Dallas designed around an enclosed atrium. The design featured dark gray glass cladding for twin office towers contrasted with poured in place concrete for the hotel and garage. Construction on the 5.5-acre (2.2 ha) site began in 1978 and finished in 1980.

In 1983 an additional office building, the 26-story Univision Center (formerly Plaza of the Americas III and Allianz Financial Centre), was constructed across Crockett Street and connected to the complex. An additional parking garage was added in 1984. Through an agreement with the city the developers received tax-exempt bond financing in exchange for a promise to develop 100 units of housing above the garage within 5 years. A fourth 26-story building, Plaza of the Americas IV, was also planned across Crockett Street. In 1989 plans changed to increase the building to 42-stories, but the structure was never built.

The complex became a hub of the Dallas Pedestrian Network when skybridges connected Plaza of the Americas to Bryan Tower, Sheraton Dallas Hotel and Chase Tower. The complex was sold and renovated in 1990.

Over the years Plaza of the Americas has hosted many events including prominent sculpture shows, conventions and the Texas Open Squash Tournament.

== See also ==
- List of buildings and structures in Dallas, Texas
