= Texas Commerce Tower =

Texas Commerce Tower may refer to:

- JPMorgan Chase Tower (Dallas), formerly known as Texas Commerce Tower
- JPMorgan Chase Building (Houston), formerly known as Texas Commerce Tower
- JPMorgan Chase Tower (Houston), formerly known as Texas Commerce Tower
