= List of tallest buildings in Dallas =

Skyline of Dallas
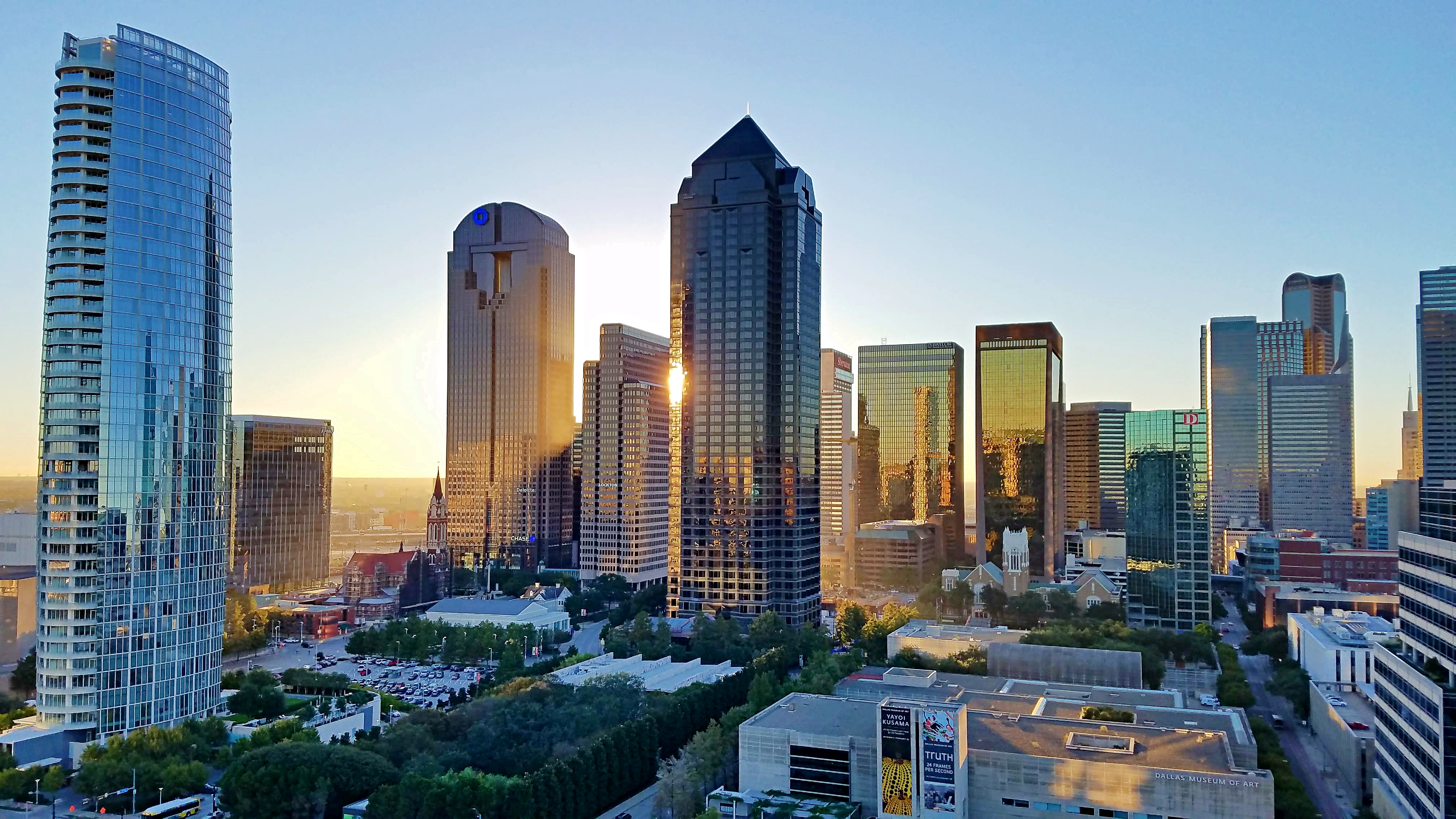
- Downtown Dallas in 2017
- Tallest building: Bank of America Plaza (1985)
- Tallest building height: 921 ft (280.7 m)
- First 150 m+ building: Gables Republic Tower (1954)

Number of tall buildings (2025)
- Taller than 100 m (328 ft): 58
- Taller than 150 m (492 ft): 20
- Taller than 200 m (656 ft): 6

Number of tall buildings — feet
- Taller than 300 ft (91.4 m): 85

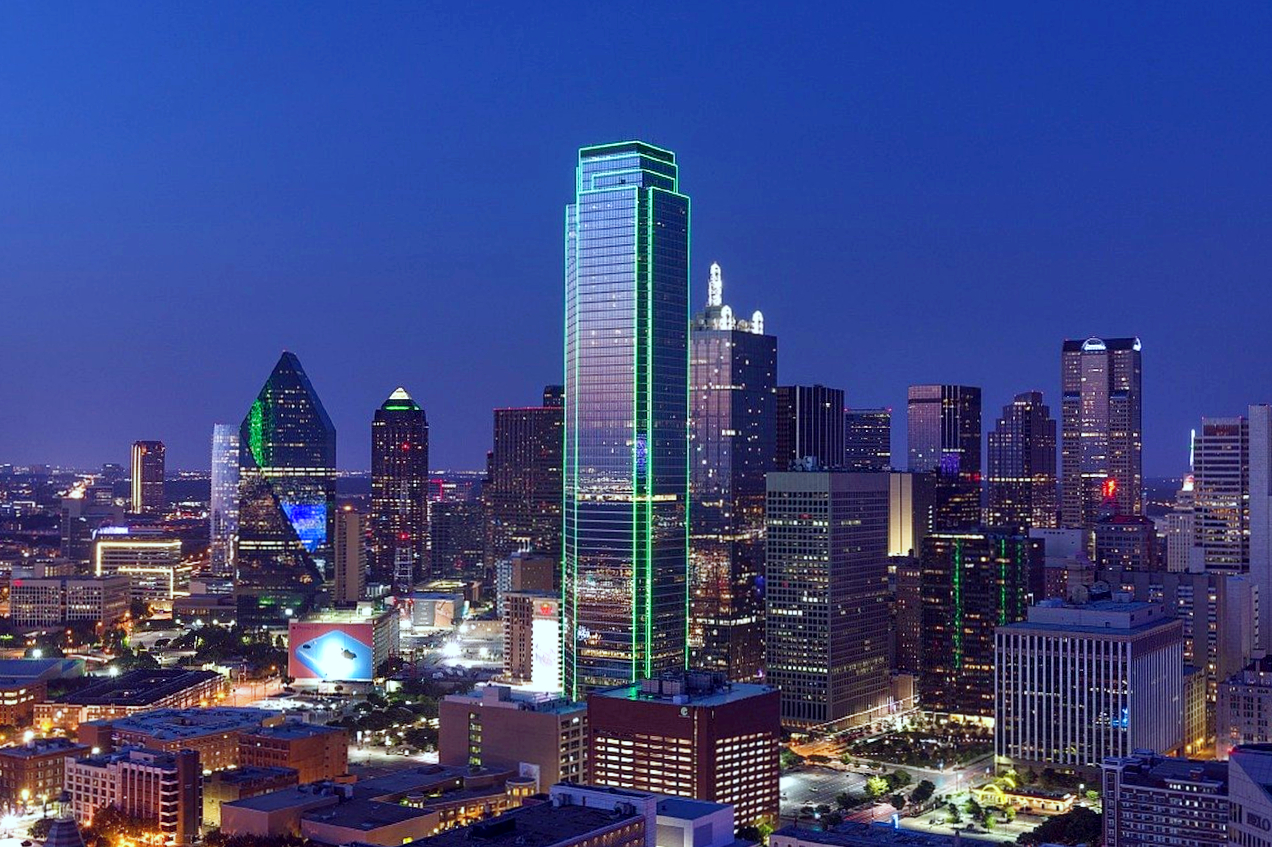
Downtown Dallas at dusk

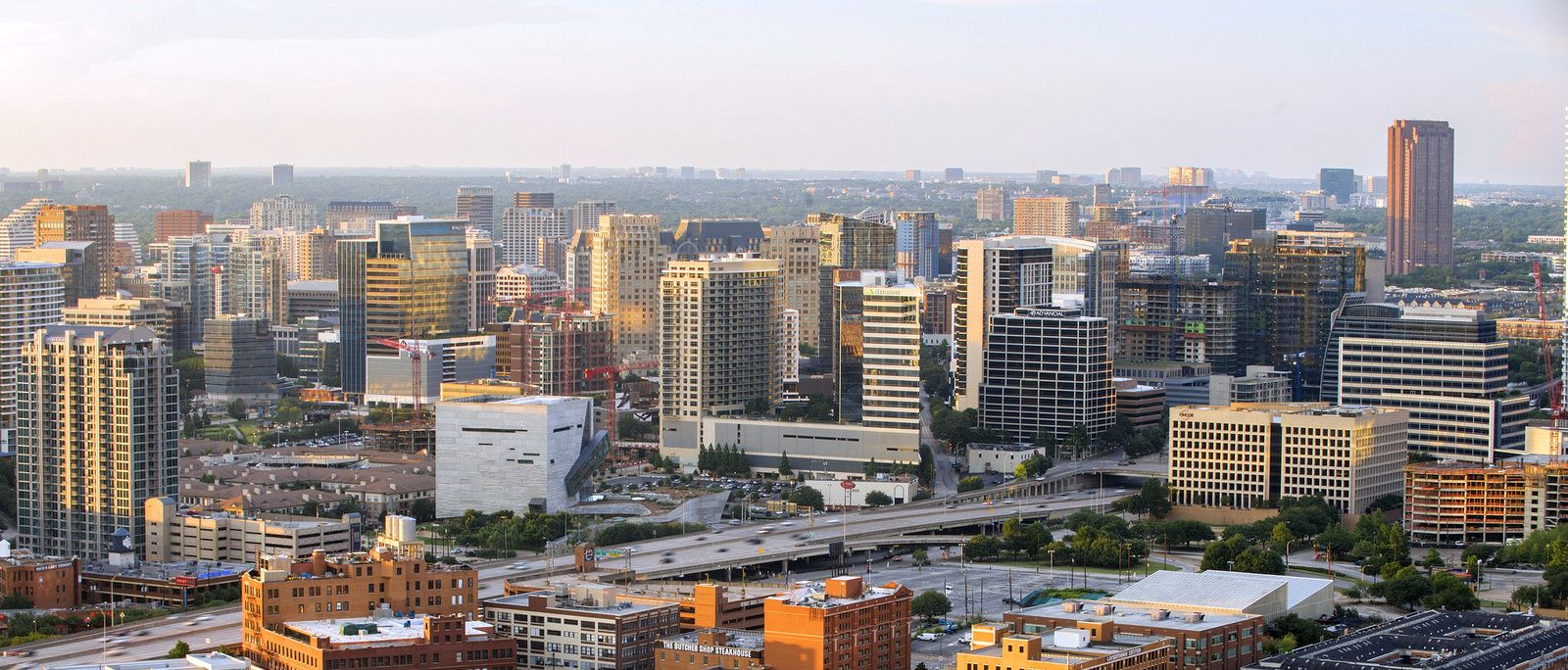
The Uptown skyline in 2017

Dallas is the third-largest city in the U.S. state of Texas. It is the largest city in the Dallas-Fort Worth metroplex, the fourth-largest metropolitan area in the United States, with a population of 8.3 million as of 2024. Dallas is the site of 85 completed high-rise buildings over 300 feet (91 m), 20 of which stand taller than 492 ft (150 m). Dallas' skyline is one of the largest in the Southern United States. It has the second most skyscrapers taller than 492 ft (150 m) in Texas, after Houston. The tallest building is the Bank of America Plaza, which rises 921 ft (281 m) in Downtown Dallas and was completed in 1985.

The history of skyscrapers in the city began with the 14-story Praetorian Building in 1909, often regarded the first in Dallas or even the entire Western United States. The 1920s saw the construction of notable office towers such as the Davis Building, Santa Fe Building, and the Magnolia Building. While Dallas' skyline was mostly unchaged during the Great Depression and World War II, the Mercantile National Bank Building was the only major office building completed during the war. Built in 1943, it was the tallest building completed during World War II. After the war, Dallas resumed high-rise construction earlier than most U.S cities. Gables Republic Tower, completed in 1958, was the first building to surpass 492 ft (150 m) in Dallas. From the mid-1950s to 1970s, the city's skyline grew steadily under a skyscraper boom downtown. Dallas' current second-tallest building, Renaissance Tower, was built during this period to a height of 710 ft (216 m). Its height was later increased to 886 ft (270 m) in 1986.

The energy boom of the early 1980s led to a surge in skyscraper construction, including the completion of Bank of America Plaza, Comerica Bank Tower, Chase Tower, and Fountain Place. Out of the ten tallest buildings in Dallas, eight were built during the 1980s, and none were completed after 1987. The later oil glut and early 1990s recession brought an end to the boom, and the downtown skyline has grew little until the mid-2000s. In the 21st century, high-rise development in Dallas has centered around an area northwest of downtown, mainly in Uptown and Victory Park. Although the number of buildings taller than 300 ft (91 m) increased from 53 in 2000 to 85 in 2025, the amount of them taller than 492 ft (150 m) only increased from 18 to 20. The two additions are Museum Tower and AMLI Fountain Place, both located downtown.

Dallas-Fort Worth is the largest metropolitan area in the United States without a supertall skyscraper. The height of skyscrapers in Dallas is impacted by the Dallas Love Field airport, whose flight paths cover downtown and areas to its northwest. The tallest buildings in Dallas are concentrated in downtown, with a noticeable decrease in height north of Spur 366 that divides downtown from Uptown and Victory Park. High-rise buildings extend further northwards towards Oak Lawn, including in the neighborhood of Turtle Creek. There is a much smaller cluster of towers around the Galleria Dallas, in the city's north, as well as shorter high-rises on both sides of State Highway 75. High-rises are sparse throughout the rest of the city. While not a skyscraper, the 560 ft (171 m) Reunion Tower is one of the skyline's most iconic landmarks, recognizable for its spherical geodesic dome. The tower's observation deck is a popular photography spot for Dallas' skyline.

== History ==
Number of buildings by height in Dallas by the end of each year. Click on the legend to toggle a specific height on or off. View chart definition.

== Cityscape ==
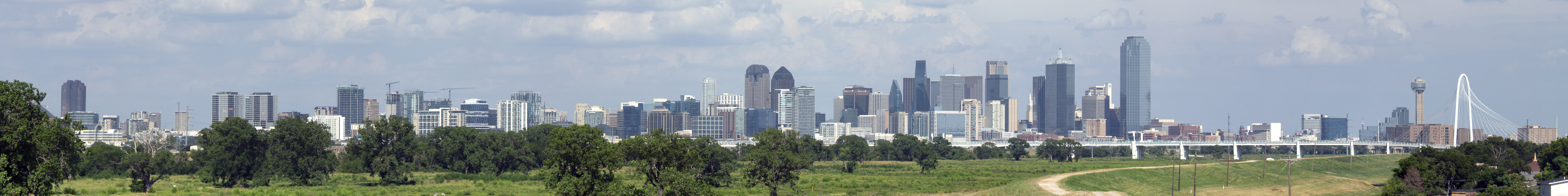
Dallas skyline in 2024, with Uptown (left), downtown (center), Reunion Tower, and the Margaret Hunt Hill Bridge (far right)

== Map of tallest buildings ==
The map below shows the location of buildings taller than 300 feet (91 m) in Dallas' downtown and Uptown. Each marker is numbered by height and colored by the decade of the building's completion. Buildings located outside the map are denoted with an asterisk (*)

Buildings taller than 300 ft (91 m) in Dallas. An asterisk (*) next to the building's name indicates it is located outside the map.
- 1950s and before
- 1960s
- 1970s
- 1980s
- 1990s
- 2000s
- 2010s
- 2020s
1 Bank of America Plaza
2 Renaissance Tower
3 Comerica Bank Tower
4 Chase Tower
5 Fountain Place
6 Trammell Crow Center
7 1700 Pacific
8 Santander Tower
9 Energy Plaza
10 First National Bank Tower
11 Gables Republic Tower
12 Republic Center Tower II
13 One AT&T Plaza
14 Ross Tower
15 AMLI Fountain Place
16 Tower at Cityplace*
17 Museum Tower
18 Sheraton Dallas Hotel Central Tower
19 Mercantile National Bank Building
20 Bryan Tower
21 Harwood Center
22 717 Harwood
23 2100 Ross Avenue
24 Renaissance Dallas Hotel*
25 One Dallas Center
26 Sheraton Dallas Hotel North Tower
27 One Main Place
28 Atelier Tower
29 HALL Arts Hotel and Residences
30 W Dallas Victory Hotel & Residences
31 1600 Pacific Tower
32 The Victor
33 Mosaic I
34 Magnolia Building
35 23Springs
36 The Katy
37 Harwood No. 14 Office Tower
38 Azure
39 Bleu Ciel
40 Three AT&T Plaza
41 The House
42 The Epic II
43 AC Hotel/Residence Inn Downtown Dallas
44 Residences at Park District
45 The Christopher at the Union
46 Three Galleria Tower*
47 Sheraton Dallas Hotel South Tower
48 1900 North Pearl Street
49 Hyatt Hotel
50 2811 Maple Avenue
51 The Metropolitan
52 McKinney & Olive
53 One Arts Plaza
54 Saint Ann Court
55 One Galleria Tower I*
56 Plaza of the Americas North Tower
57 Plaza of the Americas South Tower
58 Victory Place
59 Adolphus Tower
60 Park Central III*
61 Two Galleria Tower*
62 Occidental Tower*
63 Davis Building
64 Manor House
65 Parkland Memorial Hospital*
66 2850 Harwood
67 Preston Tower*
68 Anatole Hotel*
69 PwC Tower at Park District
70 Tower Petroleum Building
71 The Union Dallas
72 Adolphus Hotel
73 Cirque
74 Cortland on McKinney
75 One Victory Park
76 Tower Residences at the Ritz-Carlton
77 Fairmont Dallas 1
78 The Hamilton
79 Urby Dallas Phase 2
80 City Walk
81 Mayfair at Turtle Creek*
82 Lincoln Hotel*
83 Urby Dallas Phase 1
84 Santa Fe Building
85 Two Turtle Creek Village*

== Tallest buildings ==
This lists ranks the tallest buildings in Dallas as of September 2025 that stand at least 300 feet (91 m) tall, based on standard height measurement. This height includes spires and architectural details, but does not include antenna masts. (Note: If two or more buildings are of the same height, they are listed in order of floor count, then alphabetically. The "Year" column indicates the year in which a building was completed.) Freestanding observation towers are included for comparison purposes but not ranked. (Note: According to the Council on Tall Buildings and Urban Habitat, freestanding observation towers with fewer than 50 percent of their height occupiable are not considered buildings.)

Was the tallest building in Dallas upon completion

Rank	Name	Image	Location	Height ft (m)	Floors	Year	Purpose	Notes
1	Bank of America Plaza		32°46′47.9″N 96°48′14.3″W	921 (280.7)	72	1985	Office	Tallest building completed in Dallas in the 1980s.
2	Renaissance Tower		32°46′52.3″N 96°48′6.6″W	886 (270.1)	56	1974	Office	Tallest building completed in Dallas in the 1970s. Originally built as the First International Building at a height of 710 ft (216 m). It underwent a major renovation in 1986, which increased its height to 886 ft (270 m).
3	Comerica Bank Tower		32°46′53.7″N 96°47′47.3″W	787 (239.9)	60	1987	Mixed-use	Mixed-use office, residential, and hotel building.
4	Chase Tower		32°47′16.2″N 96°47′48″W	738 (225)	55	1987	Office	Also known as Chase Arts Tower since 2023.
5	Fountain Place		32°47′4.9″N 96°48′9.2″W	720 (219.5)	62	1986	Office	
6	Trammell Crow Center		32°47′15.3″N 96°47′57.3″W	686 (209.1)	50	1984	Office	
7	1700 Pacific		32°46′56.3″N 96°47′47.3″W	655 (199.7)	50	1983	Office	
8	Santander Tower		32°46′55.2″N 96°47′54.1″W	645 (196.5)	50	1982	Mixed-use	Mixed-use office, residential, and hotel building.
9	Energy Plaza		32°46′59.4″N 96°47′56.7″W	629 (191.7)	49	1983	Mixed-use	Also known as the Sinclair Residences. Mixed-use office and residential building.
10	First National Bank Tower		32°46′53″N 96°48′2.4″W	628 (191.4)	52	1965	Mixed-use	Also known as The National. Tallest building completed in Dallas in the 1960s. Mixed-use residential, hotel, and office building.
11	Gables Republic Tower		32°46′59.6″N 96°47′52.6″W	602 (183.5)	36	1954	Residential	Tallest building completed in Dallas in the 1950s. Also known as Republic Center Tower I. Formerly known as Republic National Bank Building. Tallest fully residential building in Dallas since its renovation in 2007.
12	Republic Center Tower II		32°46′59.9″N 96°47′50.4″W	598 (182.3)	50	1964	Office	
13	One AT&T Plaza		32°46′46.3″N 96°47′55.7″W	580 (176.8)	37	1984	Office	
14	Ross Tower		32°47′3.4″N 96°48′0.7″W	579 (176.5)	45	1984	Office	
15	AMLI Fountain Place	–	32°47′08″N 96°48′12″W	562 (171.3)	46	2020	Residential	
N/A	Reunion Tower		32°46′34.1″N 96°48′32.8″W	560 (170.7)	—	1978	Observation	Not a habitable building; included for comparison purposes.
16	Tower at Cityplace		32°48′19.9″N 96°47′32.7″W	560 (170.7)	42	1988	Office	Tallest building in the city outside of Downtown Dallas.
17	Museum Tower		32°47′22″N 96°48′0.2″W	560 (170.7)	42	2013	Residential	Tallest building completed in Dallas in the 2010s.
18	Sheraton Dallas Hotel Central Tower		32°47′6.4″N 96°47′41.5″W	550 (167.6)	42	1959	Hotel	Tallest hotel in Dallas.
19	Mercantile National Bank Building		32°46′50.8″N 96°47′48.3″W	523 (159.4)	31	1943	Mixed-use	Tallest building completed in Dallas in the 1940s. The only major office building completed in the US during World War II. Originally built to a height of 430 ft (131 m) in 1943, it was increased to 523 ft (159 m) during a renovation in 1958. Now a mixed-use office and residential building.
20	Bryan Tower		32°47′7″N 96°47′46.9″W	512 (156.1)	40	1973	Mixed-use	Mixed-use office and residential building.
21	Harwood Center		32°47′5.5″N 96°47′49.8″W	483 (147.2)	36	1982	Office	
22	717 Harwood		32°47′8.4″N 96°47′53.4″W	481 (146.6)	34	1980	Office	
23	2100 Ross Avenue		32°47′14.9″N 96°47′51.3″W	456 (139)	33	1982	Office	
24	Renaissance Dallas Hotel		32°48′14.1″N 96°49′55.6″W	451 (137.5)	29	1983	Hotel	
25	One Dallas Center		32°47′2.5″N 96°47′48.4″W	448 (136.6)	30	1979	Mixed-use	Originally built as an office building, now a mixed-use office and residential building.
26	Sheraton Dallas Hotel North Tower		32°47′7.5″N 96°47′42.7″W	448 (136.6)	31	1980	Hotel	
27	One Main Place		32°46′49.6″N 96°48′6.9″W	445 (135.6)	34	1968	Office	.
28	Atelier Tower		32°47′20.4″N 96°47′58.0″W	440 (134.2)	41	2021	Residential	
29	HALL Arts Hotel and Residences		32°47′21.9″N 96°47′46.6″W	440 (134)	28	2020	Mixed-use	Mixed-use hotel and residential building.
30	W Dallas Victory Hotel & Residences		32°47′18.8″N 96°48′32.8″W	439 (133.8)	32	2006	Mixed-use	Tallest building completed in Dallas in the 2000s. Mixed-use hotel and residential building.
31	1600 Pacific Tower		32°46′54.7″N 96°47′56″W	434 (132.3)	31	1964	Mixed-use	Mixed-use hotel and residential building.
32	The Victor		32°47′20.4″N 96°48′37.7″W	432 (131.7)	39	2021	Residential	
33	Mosaic I		32°46′56.6″N 96°47′59.2″W	400 (121.9)	33	1959	Residential	Originally an office building. Vacant from 1992 to 2004, when it was converted to a residential building.
34	Magnolia Building		32°46′48.8″N 96°47′56.7″W	399 (121.6)	27	1923	Hotel	Tallest building completed in Dallas in the 1920s. Originally an office building.
35	23Springs	–	32°47′48.1″N 96°48′21.0″W	399 (121.6)	26	2025	Office	
36	The Katy		32°47′39.3″N 96°48′48″W	394 (120.1)	30	2018	Residential	Also known as The Katy Victory Park or Katy Station.
37	Harwood No. 14 Office Tower	—	32°47′38″N 96°48′32″W	388 (118.3)	26	2023	Office	
38	Azure	—	32°46′48.8″N 96°47′56.7″W	375 (114.3)	31	2007	Residential	
39	Bleu Ciel	—	32°47′48.8″N 96°48′40.2″W	374 (114)	30	2018	Residential	
40	Three AT&T Plaza		32°46′43.7″N 96°47′55.8″W	372 (113.4)	24	1928	Office	
41	The House	—	32°47′5.8″N 96°48′34.3″W	371 (113)	28	2008	Residential	
42	The Epic II	–	32°47′3.5″N 96°47′21.6″W	367 (112)	23	2022	Office	
43	AC Hotel/Residence Inn Downtown Dallas		32°46′48.8″N 96°47′46.7″W	360 (109.7)	22	1954	Hotel	Formerly known as the Mercantile Commerce Building. Originally an office building until it was renovated in 2016.
44	Residences at Park District		32°47′27.1″N 96°48′6.9″W	358 (109) (Note: This height is an estimate by the CTBUH.)	32	2018	Residential	
45	The Christopher at the Union		32°47′22.5″N 96°48′20.8″W	355 (108.2)	29	2018	Residential	
46	Three Galleria Tower	—	32°55′37.2″N 96°49′7.2″W	354 (107.9)	26	1991	Office	
47	Sheraton Dallas Hotel South Tower		32°47′4.7″N 96°47′39.9″W	352 (107.3)	28	1958	Hotel	
48	1900 North Pearl Street		32°47′25″N 96°47′58″W	344 (105)	24	2017	Office	
49	Hyatt Hotel		32°46′34″N 96°48′35″W	343 (104.6)	30	1978	Hotel	
50	2811 Maple Avenue	–	32°47′48″N 96°48′23″W	338 (103)	30	2025	Residential	
51	The Metropolitan		32°46′47″N 96°48′05″W	336 (102.4)	26	1974	Residential	
52	McKinney & Olive		32°47′29″N 96°48′14″W	335 (102.1)	21	2016	Residential	
53	One Arts Plaza		32°47′31″N 96°47′42″W	335 (102)	24	2007	Mixed-use	Mixed-use office and residential building.
54	Saint Ann Court	–	32°47′30″N 96°48′23″W	334 (101.8)	25	2009	Office	
55	One Galleria Tower I	–	32°55′46″N 96°49′07″W	333 (101.5)	26	1983	Office	
56	Plaza of the Americas North Tower		32°47′15″N 96°47′45″W	332 (101.2)	25	1980	Office	
57	Plaza of the Americas South Tower		32°47′12″N 96°47′42″W	332 (101.2)	25	1980	Office	
58	Victory Place	–	32°47′29″N 96°48′34″W	328 (100)	25	2017	Residential	
59	Adolphus Tower	–	32°46′49″N 96°47′59″W	327 (99.7)	27	1954	Office	Also known as City Center Plaza or Center City Plaza.
60	Park Central III	–	32°55′18″N 96°46′33″W	327 (99.7)	20	1975	Office	
61	Two Galleria Tower	–	32°55′51″N 96°49′07″W	325 (99.1)	24	1985	Office	
62	Occidental Tower	–	32°55′41″N 96°49′19″W	324 (98.8)	24	1985	Office	
63	Davis Building		32°46′50″N 96°48′02″W	323 (98.5)	20	1926	Residential	
64	Manor House	–	32°46′45″N 96°48′03″W	319 (97.2)	26	1966	Residential	
65	Parkland Memorial Hospital		32°48′47″N 96°50′07″W	318 (97)	17	2015	Health	
66	2850 Harwood	–	32°47′42″N 96°48′32″W	317 (96.6)	21	2019	Office	
67	Preston Tower	–	32°51′58″N 96°48′00″W	316 (96.3)	29	1966	Residential	
68	Anatole Hotel		32°48′01″N 96°49′49″W	316 (96.3)	27	1983	Hotel	
69	PwC Tower at Park District	–	32°47′27″N 96°48′05″W	316 (96.3)	19	2018	Office	Also known as 2101 North Pearl Tower II or Park District Office Tower.
70	Tower Petroleum Building		32°46′50″N 96°48′02″W	315 (96)	22	1931	Hotel	Currently the Renaissance Saint Elm Dallas Downtown hotel. Also known as The Tower Building, or Cambria Downtown Dallas.
71	The Union Dallas	–	32°47′20″N 96°48′23″W	315 (96)	22	2018	Office	
72	Adolphus Hotel		32°46′48″N 96°47′59″W	312 (95.1)	25	1912	Hotel	
73	Cirque	–	32°47′23″N 96°48′31″W	311 (94.8)	28	2007	Residential	
74	Cortland on McKinney	–	32°47′22″N 96°48′13″W	310 (94.5)	26	2008	Residential	
75	One Victory Park	–	32°47′08″N 96°48′37″W	310 (94.5)	17	2008	Office	
76	Tower Residences at the Ritz-Carlton	–	32°47′34″N 96°48′17″W	310 (94.5)	23	2009	Residential	
77	Fairmont Dallas 1	–	32°47′07″N 96°48′06″W	308 (93.9)	24	1969	Hotel	
78	The Hamilton	–	32°47′03″N 96°47′17″W	305 (93)	26	2020	Residential	
79	Urby Dallas Phase 2	–	32°47′54″N 96°49′21″W	305 (93)	27	2024	Residential	
80	City Walk		32°47′02″N 96°48′03″W	303 (92.4)	17	1957	Residential	Also known as 511 N. Akard or The Metropolis.
81	Mayfair at Turtle Creek	–	32°48′35″N 96°48′17″W	302 (92.1)	24	2000	Residential	
82	Lincoln Hotel	–	32°55′27″N 96°49′02″W	302 (92)	24	1983	Hotel	
83	Urby Dallas Phase 1		32°47′52″N 96°49′19″W	302 (92)	27	2022	Residential	
84	Santa Fe Building		32°46′45″N 96°48′05″W	300 (91.4)	20	1926	Office	
85	Two Turtle Creek Village	–	32°48′52″N 96°48′05″W	300 (91.4)	18	1972	Office	

== Tallest under construction or proposed ==
=== Under construction ===
The following table includes buildings under construction in Dallas that are planned to be at least 300 ft (91 m) tall as of 2025, based on standard height measurement. The “Year” column indicates the expected year of completion. Buildings that are on hold are not included.

Name	Height ft (m)	Floors	Year	Purpose	Notes
Bank of America Tower at Parkside	445 (135.6)	30	2027	Office	Construction started in 2023.
Knox MSD Tower 1	399 (122)	28	2026	Mixed-use	Hotel and residential building.
Knox MSD Tower 2	330 (100)	27	2026	Residential	

=== Proposed ===
The following table includes buildings proposed in Dallas that are planned to be at least 300 ft (91 m) tall, based on standard height measurement. The “Year” column indicates the expected year of completion.

Name	Height ft (m)	Floors	Year	Purpose	Notes
Field Street Tower	600 (182.9)	38	2027	Office	Approved in 2021. Will replace Republic Center Tower II as the 12th-tallest building in Dallas. Despite approval, there are no signs of construction.

== Tallest unbuilt ==
This list ranks proposals for the construction of buildings in Dallas that were planned to rise at least 350 feet (107 m), for which planning permission was cancelled or scrapped.

Name	Height ft (m)	Floors	Cancelled	Notes
Two Dallas Main Center	921 (280.7)	72	—	Planned as a twin tower to the Bank of America Plaza. Cancelled due to the collapse of the oil and real estate market in Texas during the mid-1980s.
Griffin Square	913 (278.3)	60	1970	The project was approaching its groundbreaking in 1970, but was cancelled after the major hotel operator, Harvey Hotels, withdrew from the venture.
Republic Bank Centre	781 (238)	60	—	
2 Fountain Place	720 (219.5)	62	—	Now built as AMLI Fountain Place.
Pacific Place	781 (218)	56	—	
1900 Pacific Avenue	700 (213.4)	57	—	
Victory Tower	715 (198.1)	43	2008	Construction began in 2007, but in March 2008, the city failed to approve the project, the construction crane was dismantled, and the site was whitewashed with no further progress.
Cityplace Center Tower 2	560 (170.7)	42	—	Planned as a twin tower to the Cityplace Tower. Cancelled due to the economic downturn in 1980s.
Dallas Convention Center Hotel	532 (162)	43	—	

== Timeline of tallest buildings ==
Since 1909, the year the first high-rise in the city was constructed, the title of the tallest building in Dallas has been held by eight high-rises.

Original name	Image	Years as tallest	Height ft (m)	Floors	Notes
Praetorian Building (Note: Height estimated by Emporis. Demolished in 2013.)		1909–1912 (3 years)	184 (56.1)	14	
Adolphus Hotel		1912–1923 (11 years)	312 (95.1)	25	
Magnolia Building		1923–1943 (20 years)	399 (121.6)	27	Was later extended to 493 ft (150 m) in 1934
Mercantile National Bank Building		1943–1954 (11 years)	430 (131.1)	31	Was later extended to 523 ft (159 m) in 1958
Republic National Bank Building		1954–1959 (5 years)	602 (183.5)	36	
First National Bank Tower		1965–1974 (9 years)	628 (191.4)	52	
First International Building		1974–1985 (11 years)	710 (216.4)	56	Was later extended to 886 ft (270 m) in 1986
Bank of America Plaza		1985–present (41 years)	921 (280.7)	72	

== Skylines ==
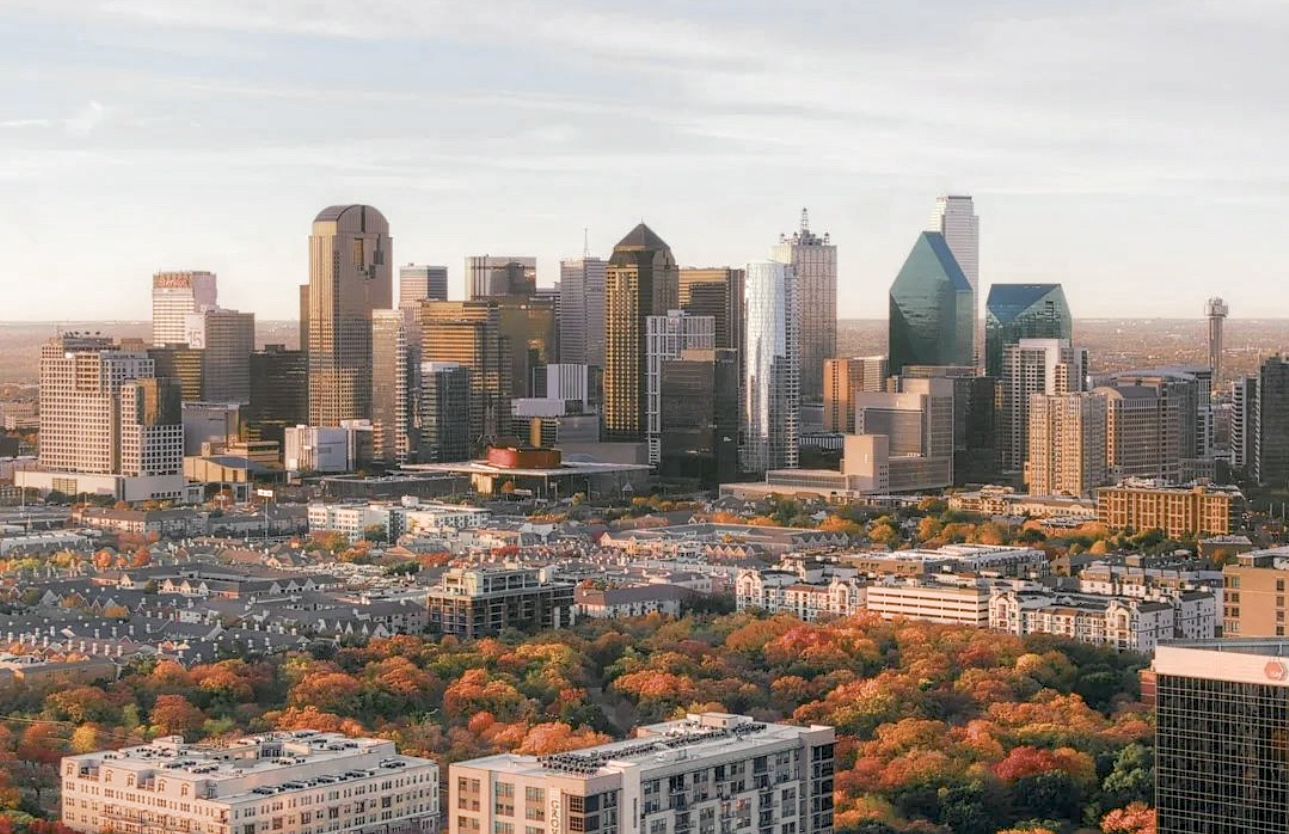
Downtown Dallas

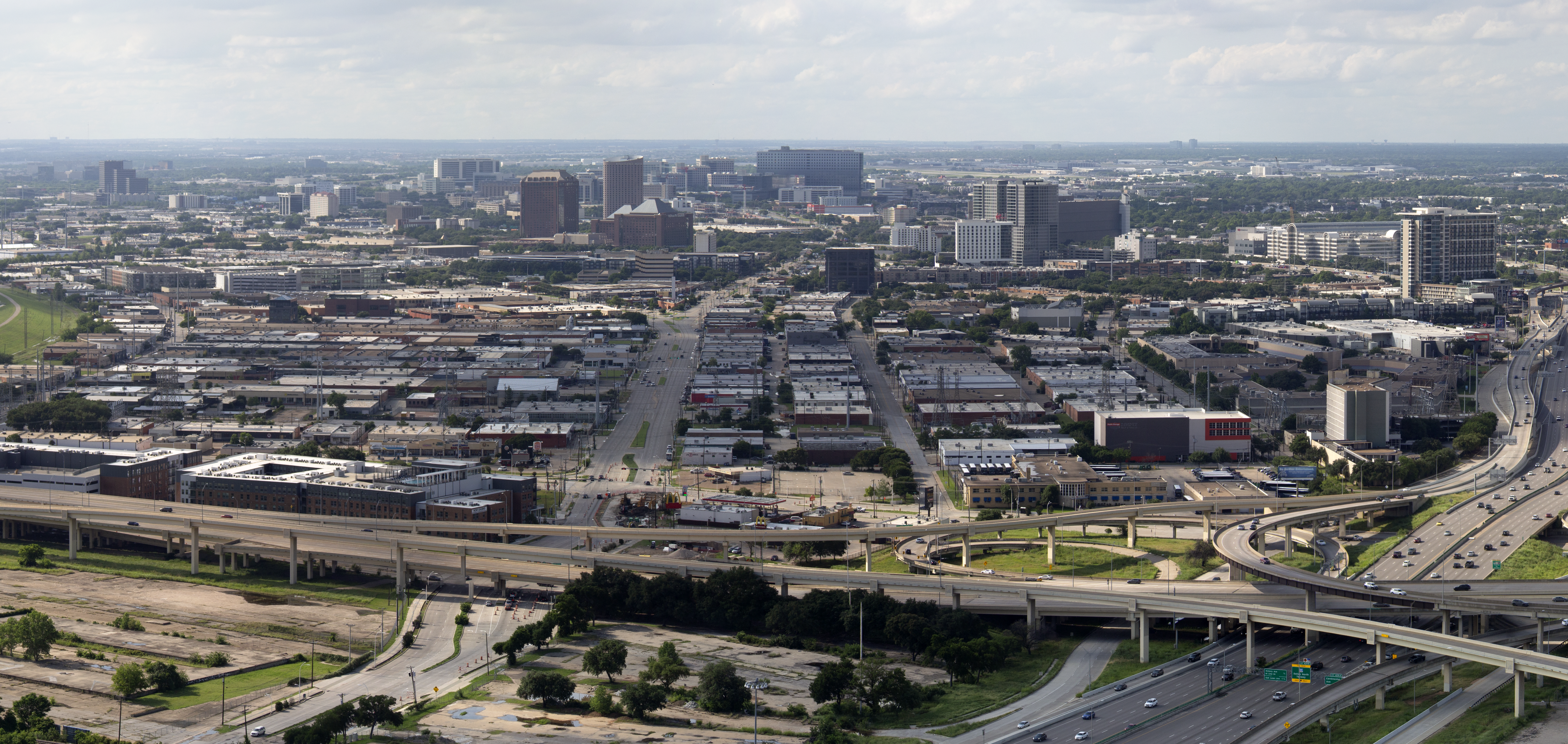
Design District

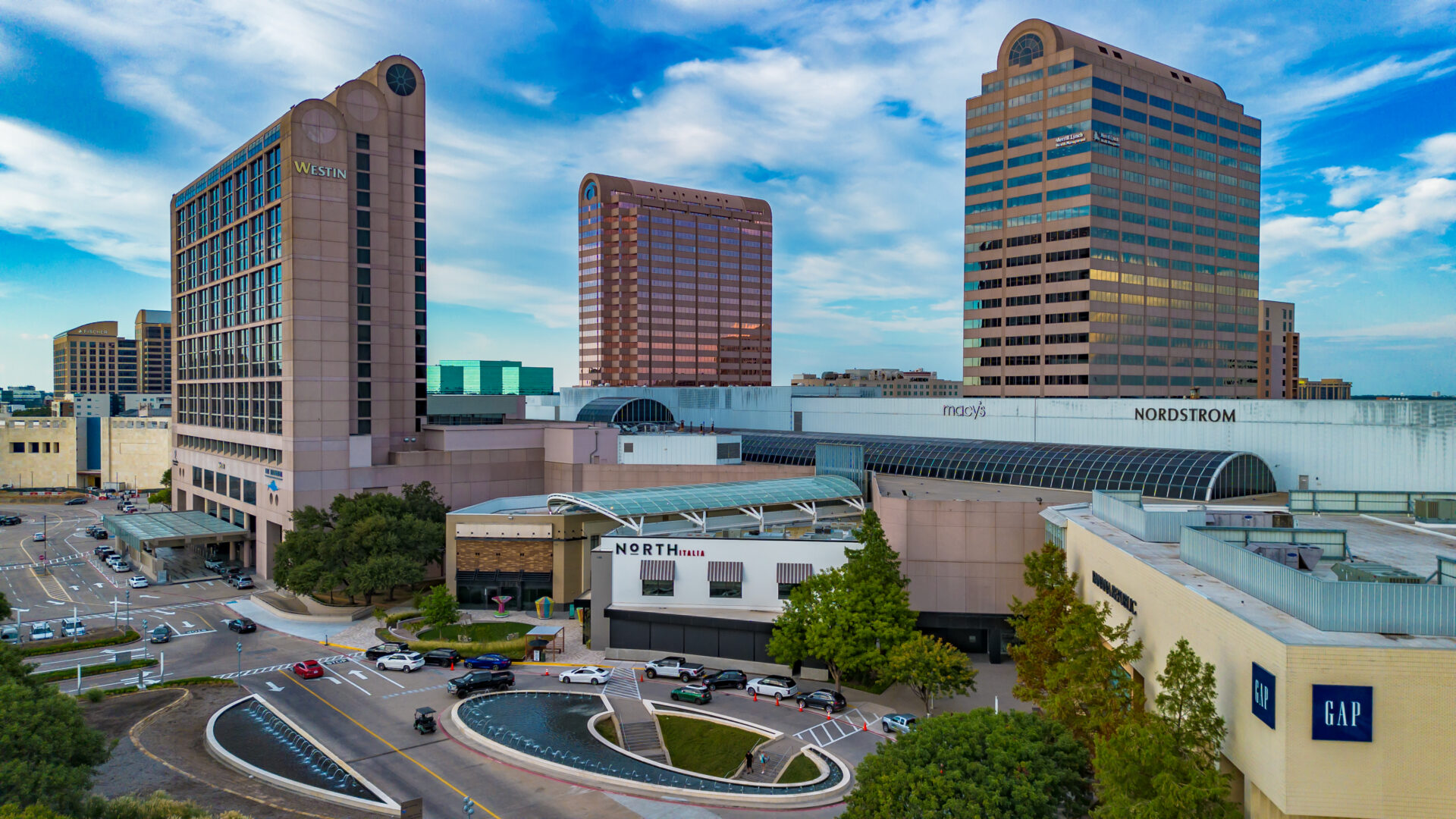
Galleria Dallas

== See also ==
- List of tallest buildings in Texas
- List of tallest buildings in Austin
- List of tallest buildings in Fort Worth
- List of tallest buildings in Houston
- List of tallest buildings in San Antonio
- List of tallest buildings in Corpus Christi
