= Pacific Tower =

Pacific Tower may refer to:

- 1600 Pacific Tower, a skyscraper in Dallas, Texas, USA
- Fresno Pacific Towers, a building in Fresno, California, USA
- Georgia-Pacific Tower, a skyscraper in downtown Atlanta, Georgia, USA
- Pacific Plaza Towers, residential skyscrapers in Makati, Philippines
- Pacific Tower, Christchurch, a building in Christchurch, New Zealand
- Pacific Tower (Seattle), a building in Seattle, Washington, USA
- Rufino Pacific Tower, a skyscraper in Makati, Philippines
