= Ross Tower =

Skyscraper in Dallas, Texas

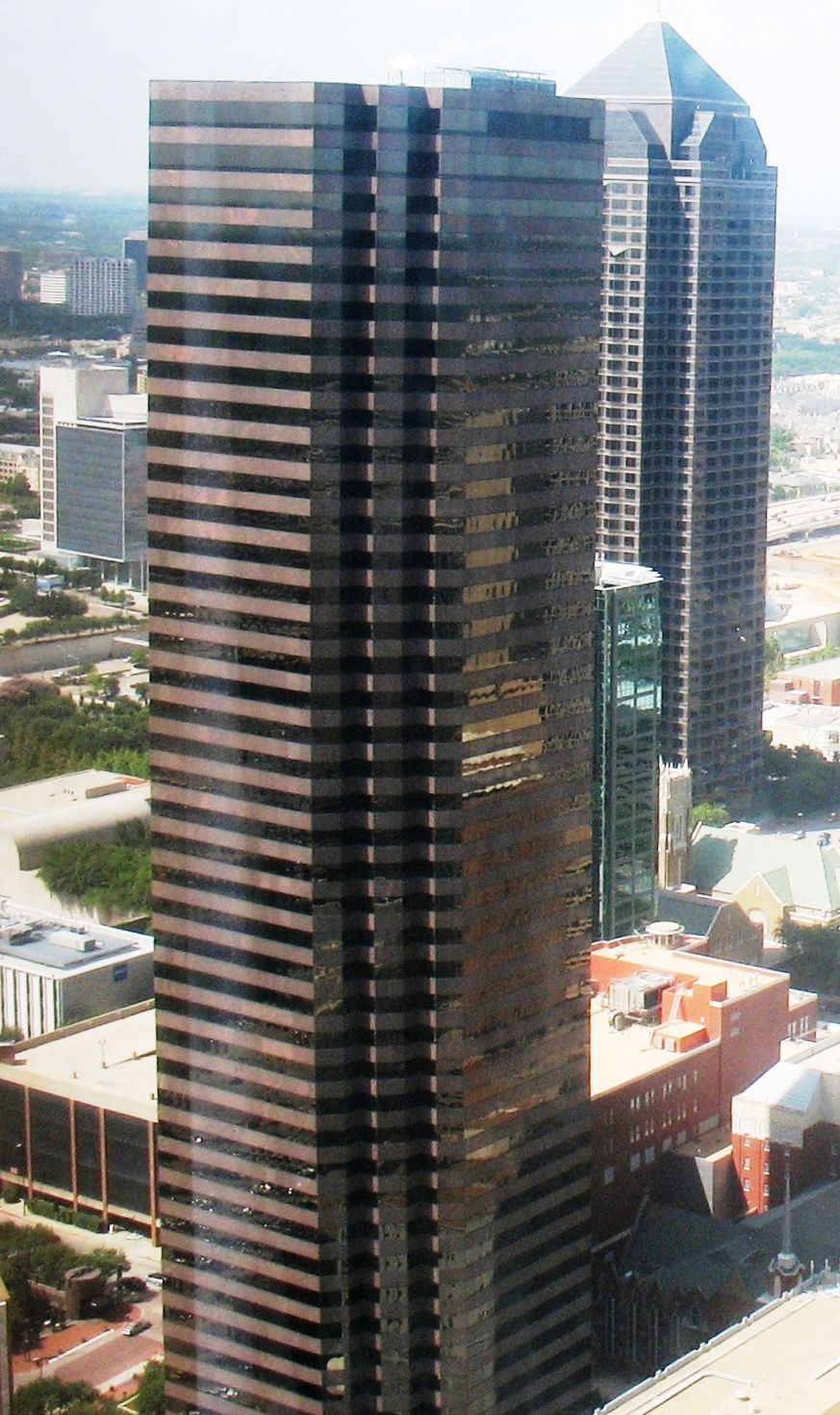
- Ross Tower, from Elm Place
- Interactive map of the Ross Tower area
- Former names: Lincoln Plaza

General information
- Architectural style: Modern
- Location: 500 North Akard Street; Dallas, Texas 75201, United States
- Coordinates: 32.7844°N 96.8003°W
- Completed: 1984
- Cost: US$72 million
- Landlord: HPI

Height
- Height: 579 ft (176 m)

Technical details
- Floor count: 45
- Floor area: 1,113,575 sq ft (103,454.5 m^{2})
- Lifts/elevators: 26

Design and construction
- Architecture firm: HKS, Inc.

Other information
- Parking: 3000 spaces

Website
- rosstower.com

Ross Tower is a 45-story high-rise in Downtown Dallas, Texas. Originally named Lincoln Plaza, the building was renamed to Ross Tower in September 2013. The building rises to a height of 579 feet (176 m) and was completed in 1984. Currently, it is the 14th-tallest building in the city.

== Major tenants ==
At one time Halliburton had its headquarters in Lincoln Plaza. As of 2002 20 employees worked in the building. The company moved its headquarters from the Southland Life Building to 50,648 square feet (4,705.4 m^{2}) of space in Lincoln Plaza in 1985. Halliburton planned to move its headquarters to Houston in 2002. Halliburton was scheduled to move to 5 Houston Center in Downtown Houston in 2003.

== Gallery ==
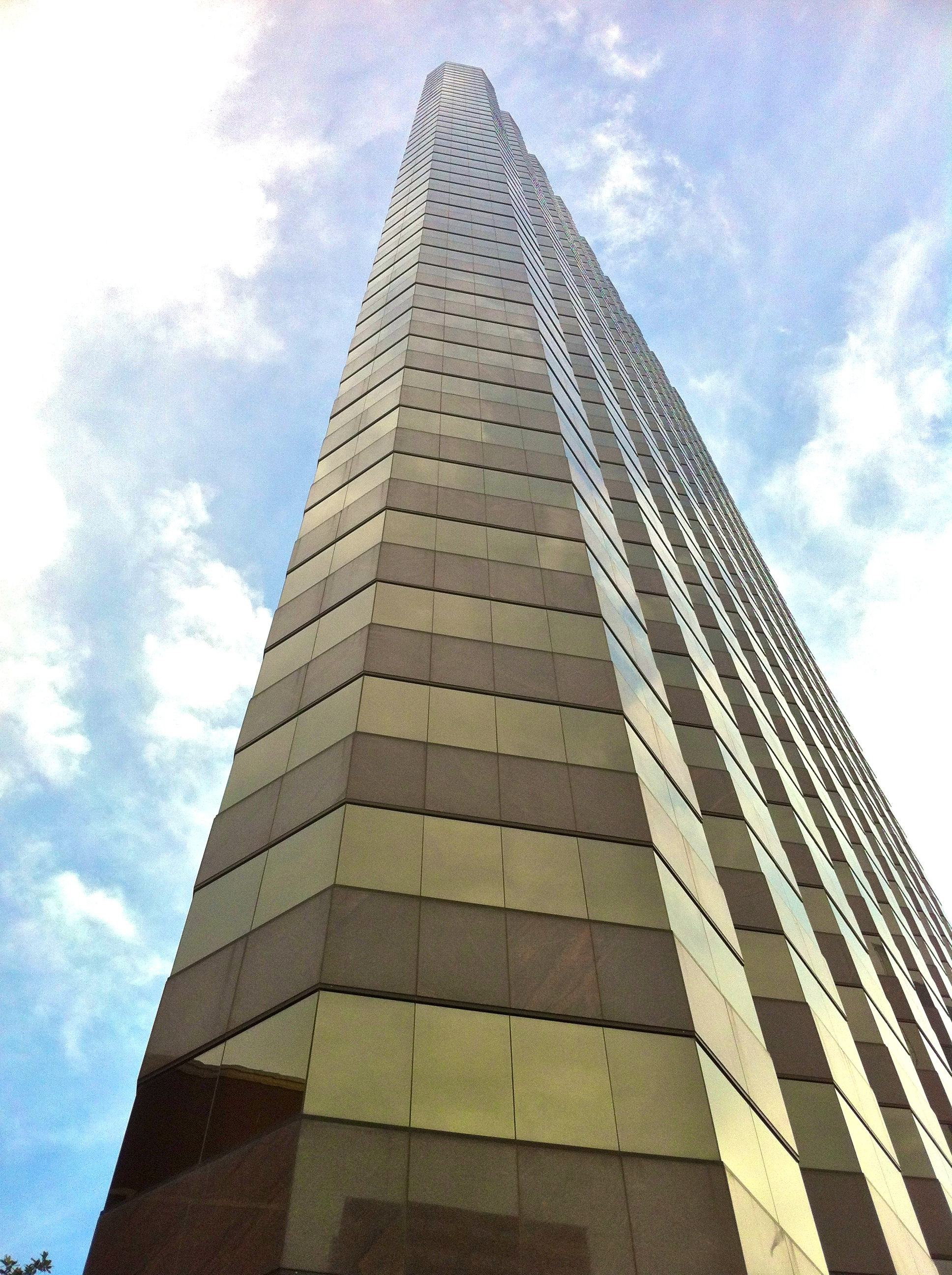
Ross Tower, Dallas

== See also ==
- List of tallest buildings in Dallas
