= San Jacinto Tower =

San Jacinto Tower may refer to:

- San Jacinto Monument, a monument in Harris County, Texas
- 2100 Ross Avenue or San Jacinto Tower, a skyscraper in Dallas, Texas
