= Museum Tower (Dallas) =

Residential high-rise in Dallas, Texas, U.S.

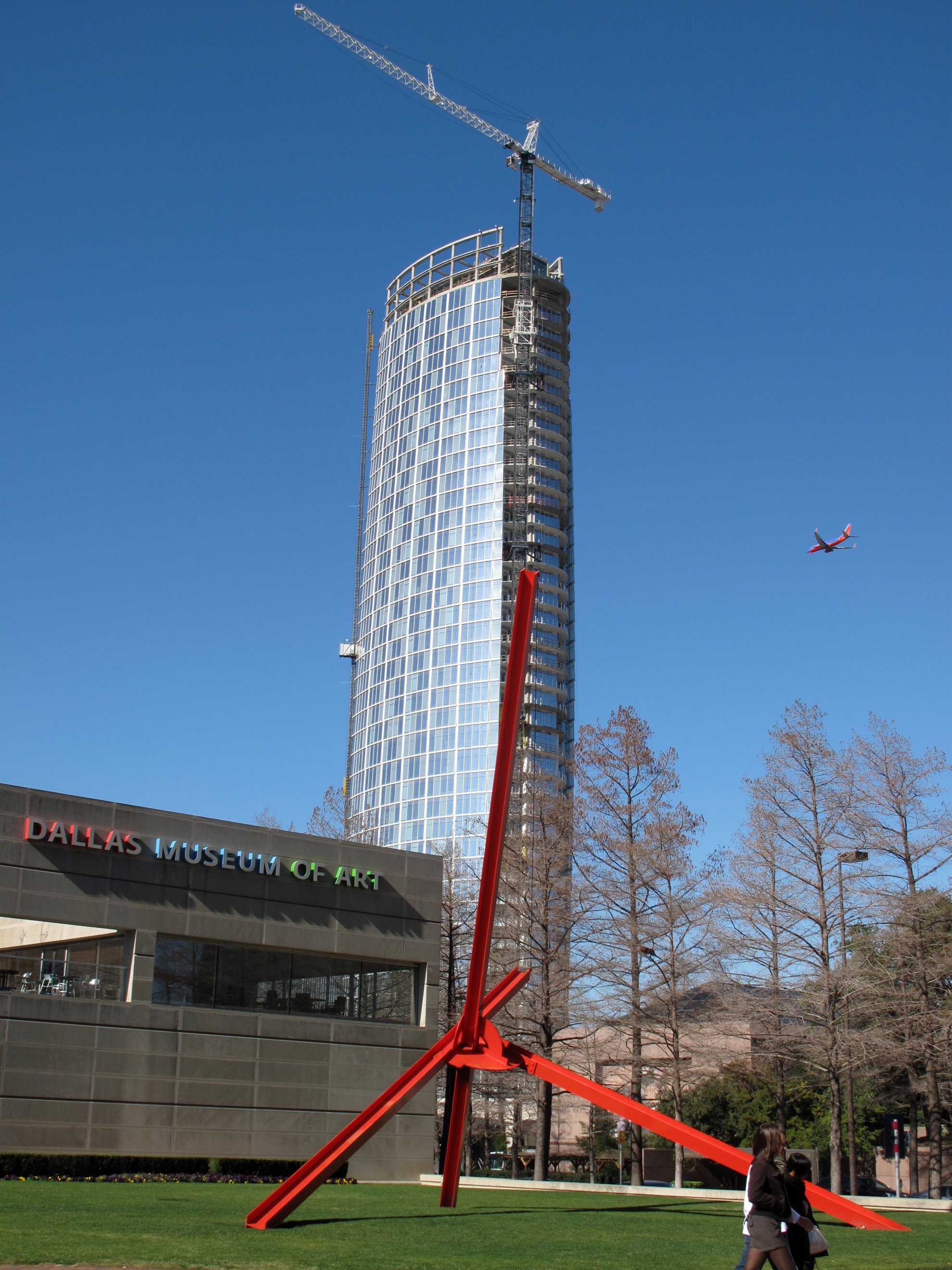
- Museum Tower while still under-construction in February 2012

General information
- Status: Completed
- Type: Residential condominiums
- Location: 1918 North Olive Street, Dallas, Texas, U.S.
- Coordinates: 32.789386°N 96.800248°W
- Construction started: 2010
- Completed: January 2013
- Cost: US$200 million

Height
- Roof: 569 ft (173 m)

Technical details
- Floor count: 42

Design and construction
- Architects: Johnson Fain Partners (DA), KTGY-GDA Architects (AOR)
- Developer: Dallas Police and Fire Pension System

Other information
- Number of units: Over 100

Museum Tower is a 42-story, 173.43 m (569.0 ft) skyscraper in the arts district of Dallas, Texas, United States. Completed in January 2013, the building is the tallest new structure to be built in the city in recent years, and is now the second-tallest residential building in Dallas, behind Gables Republic Tower.

== Height ==
Museum Tower is the 15th-tallest structure in Dallas, tied with both the Reunion Tower and Cityplace Center in height. Among all-residential buildings in Dallas it is surpassed in height only by the Republic Center Tower I, with its 184 m (604 ft) spire. However, if measuring by roof height, and thereby excluding the Republic Center Tower I's spire, Museum Tower is taller. It also breaks the record for the highest residence in Dallas, surpassing the 138 m (453 ft) Republic I. The Museum Tower is the 4th-tallest building in Dallas' Arts District, behind Chase Tower, Fountain Place, and the Trammell Crow Center; with Bank Of America Plaza being the tallest building in Dallas.

=== Design ===
Museum Tower was designed by architect Scott Johnson, a member of the Los Angeles-based Johnson Fain architectural firm and executed by architect of record, KTGY's Dallas Studio (formerly known as GDA Architects, LLC ). Originally proposed as a 20-story tower, the height was significantly increased to accommodate more residences. The glass-clad tower features an elliptical floorplan.

== Location and features ==
Situated in the center of the Arts District, Museum Tower is located adjacent to the Nasher Sculpture Center, the Meyerson Symphony Center, the Winspear Opera House and Wyly Theatre. The building consists of 115 residential condominiums, ranging from 1,650 to 8,700 square feet (153 to 808 m^{2}) in area. Each condominium will feature direct-access elevators and private balconies.

The Museum Tower's large site features a second story-level outdoor pool and public gardens. The structure is adjacent to Klyde Warren Park and a performance park, which feature public fountains and a movie pavilion.

== Groundbreaking ==
Originally proposed on June 15, 2007, developers released a tentative groundbreaking date of late 2007, but the 2008 recession put plans on hold until 2010.

As reported by The Wall Street Journal on June 15, 2010, developers had secured financing through the Dallas Police & Fire Pension System to move ahead with Museum Tower. A subsequent review of the Pension System's meeting minutes indicates that the pension fund is the owner of the entire project.

The project broke ground on Thursday, June 24, 2010. The building was completed in January 2013.

== Conflict with the Nasher ==
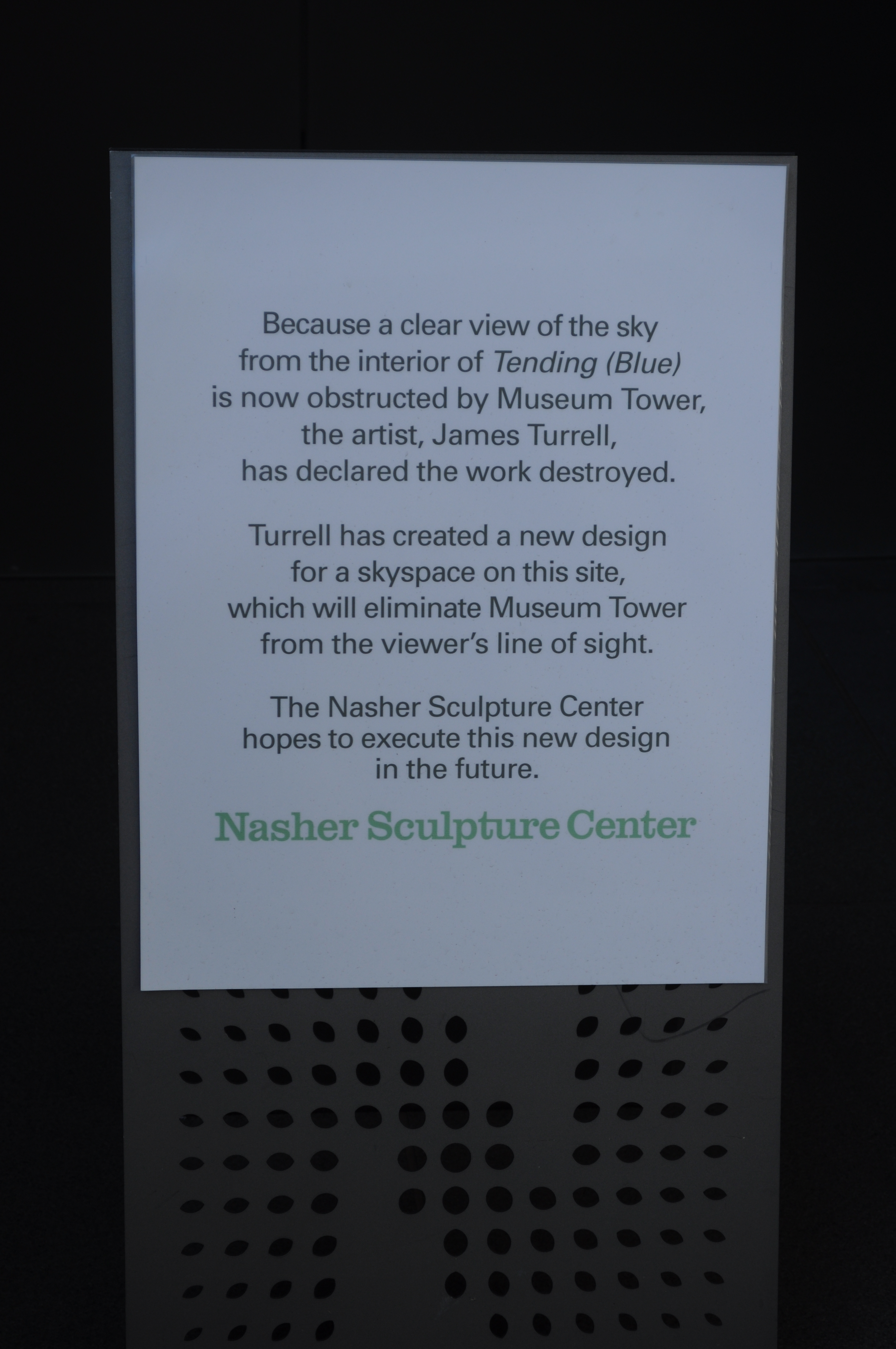
A sign posted in the sculpture garden of the Nasher states that "Because a clear view of the sky from the interior of Tending (Blue) is now obstructed by the Museum Tower, the artist, James Turrell, has declared the work destroyed."

The Museum Tower's glass has reflected an undesirable glare into the nearby Nasher Sculpture Center, whose architect Renzo Piano had specifically designed its roof to direct appropriate indirect sunlight into the galleries, based on the arc of the sun across the sky. Artist James Turrell considers his work Tending (Blue) to be effectively destroyed by the glare, and the museum has closed the interior of the sculpture to the public at his request. Peter Walker, the landscape architect who designed the Nasher's sculpture garden, has characterized the glare as "an attack on the garden and on the building and on the art." In August 2015, Museum Tower's owners declared that they would no longer consider responsibility for the glare created by the tower, citing the expense and logistical difficulties of proposed solutions.

== In popular culture ==
Exterior and interior location shoots were used in Dallas (the 2012 revived series) as the residence of the fictional character Pamela Rebecca Barnes.

== See also ==
- List of tallest buildings in Dallas
