= Thomas Dundon =

American businessman (born 1971)

- Born: September 5, 1971 (age 55); New York City, U.S.
- Education: Southern Methodist University (B.S.)
- Occupations: Financial Services; Real Estate; Sports Entertainment
- Known for: Owner of the Carolina Hurricanes and Portland Trail Blazers; Chairman and managing partner of Dundon Capital Partners; Board Member of the Alliance of American Football; Investor in Topgolf Callaway Brands; Investor in pickleball.com
- Spouse: Veruschka Tiller
- Children: 5

Thomas Dundon (born September 5, 1971) is an American billionaire businessman in financial services, real estate, and sports entertainment; he is chairman and managing partner of Dundon Capital Partners in Dallas, chairman of pickleball.com, and owner/CEO of the Carolina Hurricanes of the National Hockey League and the Portland Trail Blazers of the National Basketball Association. As of May 2026, Forbes estimated his net worth at US$2.3 billion.

He is closely associated with the collapse of the 2019 Alliance of American Football: after announcing a commitment of up to $250 million and taking control as a voting board member, he directed operations and funding but halted further financing within eight weeks, after which the league suspended play on April 2, 2019 and its entities entered Chapter 7 liquidation. In subsequent bankruptcy proceedings, the trustee alleged an oral $250 million commitment and cited Dundon’s public statements; Dundon testified that the $250 million figure was promotional rather than contractual, and court filings described his statements as inconsistent.

== Early life and career ==
Dundon was raised in Atco, New Jersey; Houston, Texas; and Plano, Texas, where his family settled when he was 15 years old. His father managed pizzerias, and his mother worked as a secretary. He has an older brother. Dundon graduated from Plano High School.

Dundon attended Southern Methodist University, and was president of Phi Gamma Delta, earning a bachelor's degree in economics in 1993.

== Business career ==
After graduation, he operated a burger restaurant, Izzy's in Fort Worth, Texas, that closed within one year. Dundon began his career working in financing at a Chevrolet used car dealership, where he would learn about the business of auto loans.

In the 1990s, he co-founded the subprime lender Drive Financial Services, which offered high-interest loans to people with higher credit risk. The company was acquired by the Spanish company Banco Santander in 2006, transforming Drive Financial Services into Santander Consumer USA. The company has been sued by attorneys general in several states for predatory lending practices. By the time he left in 2015, Dundon was chairman and chief executive officer of the company. In 2020, Santander settled the lawsuit.

After leaving Santander, Dundon started his own firm, Dundon Capital Partners, and bought a 33-story building in downtown Dallas. Dundon's investments via the firm include Lantern Specialty Care (formerly Employer Direct Healthcare), a healthcare services company, Exeter Finance, an auto finance company, and Pacific Elm Properties, a Dallas-based real estate company. Also after leaving Santander, Dundon cofounded Trinity Forest Golf Club in Dallas. Exeter Finance has been under investigation by attorneys general in multiple states over predatory lending practices, and has settled lawsuits in Massachusetts and Delaware.

== Sports investments ==
=== Carolina Hurricanes ===
In late 2017, Dundon became involved in purchasing the Carolina Hurricanes of the National Hockey League from owner Peter Karmanos Jr. who had owned the team since it was the Hartford Whalers. Dundon became majority owner of the team on January 11, 2018, in a transaction where he purchased 52% of the team and the operating rights to PNC Arena for $420 million.

On June 30, 2021, Dundon completed the purchase of all minority shares in the team, leaving him as the sole owner of the Hurricanes franchise.

On March 5, 2026, Dundon finalized a sale of 12.5% of the Hurricanes to investors Brett Jefferson, Bobby Farnham, and Marc Grandisson at a $2.66 billion valuation.

In June 2026, the Hurricanes made the Stanley Cup Final for the first time since 2006 and won the Stanley Cup. In the aftermath of the championship, Dundon received some criticism for having his family members' names engraved on the trophy, in a more prominent position than the names of the players and coaches and the family members not being employed by the team in any way.

=== Alliance of American Football ===
On February 19, 2019, the Alliance of American Football announced a $250 million investment by Dundon and named him as a member of the board of directors. The cash infusion is believed to have saved the league from a short-term financial crisis. Reports noted that Dundon reserved the right to end his investment at any time.

Dundon's first publicly visible move as a member of the board of directors, was to move the AAF's championship to the Ford Center at the Star in Frisco, Texas, after meeting with Dallas Cowboys owner Jerry Jones and negotiating the change in venue. The move was an effort to align the AAF with the NFL. While the game had originally been scheduled for Sam Boyd Stadium in Nevada and ticket refunds had to be issued, the AAF's local partners were reportedly "understanding" of the venue change. Dundon later expressed concern for the future of the AAF if the National Football League Players Association was unable to share players. The NFLPA was reportedly reluctant to share players because of injury concerns.

The AAF suspended operations on April 2, 2019.

=== Pickleball ===
On December 27, 2021, Dundon's investment firm Dundon Capital Partners acquired Pickleball Central, the largest online pickleball retail site in the world. The acquisition also included Pickleball Central's affiliated PickleballTournaments.com software.

On October 5, 2022, pickleball.com launched, citing an investment from Dundon.

On November 9, 2022, Major League Pickleball announced a strategic merger with the PPA Tour's VIBE Pickleball League. "Coming together as one team league allows us to build much bigger events, offer more prize money, enhance player development, pursue larger media and sponsorship deals and, most importantly, grow the game we all love", Dundon said in a joint announcement with Major League Pickleball's Steve Kuhn.

=== Portland Trail Blazers ===
On August 13, 2025, Dundon and a group of investors agreed to purchase the Portland Trail Blazers of the National Basketball Association from the estate of Paul G. Allen for approximately $4.2 billion. On March 30, 2026, the NBA Board of Governors approved the sale for $4.25 billion.

Famously nicknamed "El Cheapo," Dundon reportedly refused to let two-way players travel with them in the postseason, cancelled traditional free playoff T-shirts for fans at home games and cut one of the team's two mascots to save nominal amounts of money. He also refused to pay for the team's support staff's late check out at a hotel during a playoff play-in game. He was also criticized for discussing the Blazers head coaching situation during the 2025-26 NBA season while interim head coach Tiago Splitter was leading the team to the playoffs, as well for his hiring of Micah Nori at below-market rate for a head NBA coach, and for the structure of Nori's contract, which only includes a single guaranteed year.

As of June 2026, Dundon is locked in a controversy over whether he should contribute to a $600 million renovation of the team's home venue, the Moda Center. He has refused to consider making any contribution at all, stating "It feels like we're making a pretty big investment by staying here and paying these tax rates."

== Personal life ==
Dundon is married to Veruschka Tiller, a former NFL San Francisco 49ers Cheerleader and member of the 1997 Gold Rush; they have five children and live in Dallas, Texas.

Sporting positions
Preceded by Jody Allen	Portland Trail Blazers principal owner 2026–present	Incumbent
Preceded by Peter Karmanos Jr.	Carolina Hurricanes principal owner 2018–present	Incumbent
