= One Main Place (Dallas) =

Skyscraper in Dallas, Texas

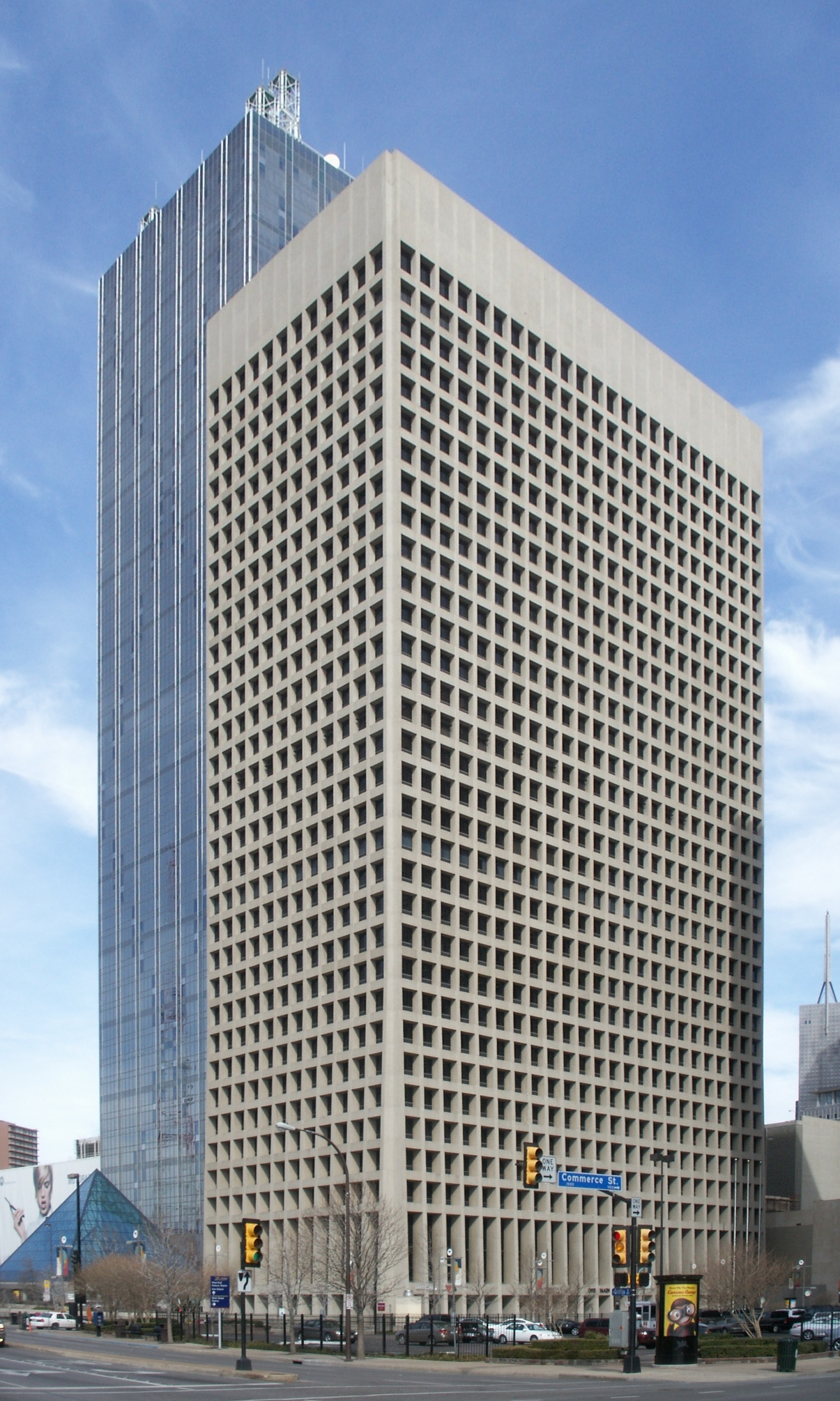
- One Main Place in 2006

- Location within Texas Location within the United States

General information
- Status: Completed
- Type: Office Building/Hotel
- Architectural style: Modern Movement: International Style, New Formalism
- Location: 1201 Main Street, Dallas, Texas, United States
- Coordinates: 32°46′50″N 96°48′08″W
- Construction started: 1964
- Completed: 1968
- Opening: 1968

Height
- Roof: 445 ft (136 m)

Technical details
- Floor count: 33
- Grounds: 2.4 acres (0.97 ha)

Design and construction
- Architecture firm: Skidmore, Owings & Merrill
- Developer: One Main Place Corporation
- Structural engineer: Walter P. Moore
- Other designers: Gordon Bunshaft, Harwood K. Smith and Partners
- Main contractor: The Beck Group

Website
- One Main
- One Main Place
- U.S. National Register of Historic Places
- Dallas Landmark
- NRHP reference No.: 15000245
- DLMK No.: H/150

Significant dates
- Added to NRHP: May 15, 2015
- Designated DLMK: July 1, 2017

One Main Place is a mixed-use skyscraper hotel and office building at 1201 Main Street in Dallas, Texas. The building rises 445 ft (136 m). Designed by Gordon Bunshaft of Skidmore, Owings & Merrill, it contains 33 above-ground floors, and was completed in 1968. One Main Place is the 27th-tallest building in the city. The building was added to the National Register of Historic Places in 2015.

Originally conceived in the 1950s by the Dallas, Texas, Corporation to become Dallas's first Superblock, the building's 30,000-sq-ft footprint occupies only a third of the 2.4-acre property, almost a full city block. To the east and west of the property, recessed plazas provided tenants with access to the exterior without the intrusion of automobiles. The 1.1 million-sq-ft building includes five subsurface levels tied to the Dallas Pedestrian Network and a 700-space parking garage. Excavation work on the project began in 1965 and construction was completed in 1968. Following completion, One Main was immediately sold to Equitable Life Insurance Company. Subsequent owners included RREEF and RAK Group. Today, New Orleans–based KFK Group owns the building known as "One Main".

In 2015, a large portion of the building was converted to a hotel, the Westin Dallas Downtown. Opened in December 2015, the hotel has an entrance on the ground floor, while the second floor of the building houses the hotel's public rooms, with the lobby in the former banking hall, as well as a restaurant and a bar. The third floor houses convention facilities. The top 10 floors of the building have been converted to hotel rooms, leaving 10 floors of offices. The 32nd floor houses a pool and the Westin Workout Studio overlooking Main Street.

== In popular culture ==
Lobby and exteriors of the building were used in location filming and for establishing shots in seasons two and three of the original night-time drama Dallas. In the show, the building housed the offices of Cliff Barnes during his tenure as head of the fictional Office of Land Management.

== See also ==
- National Register of Historic Places listings in Dallas County, Texas
- List of Dallas Landmarks
- List of tallest buildings and structures in Dallas
