= Santander Tower =

Skyscraper located in downtown Dallas

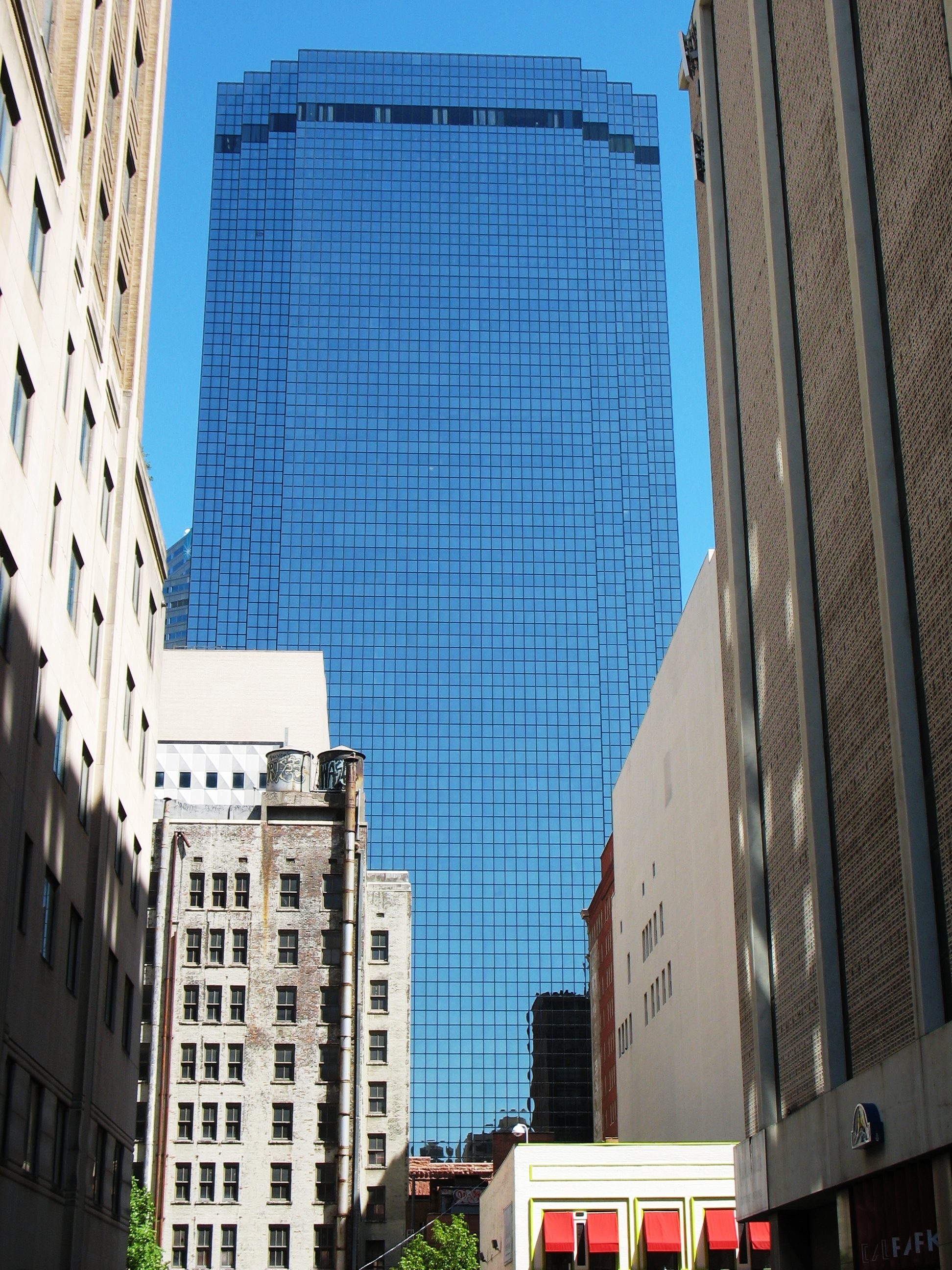
- Former names: Thanksgiving Tower

General information
- Status: Completed
- Type: Commercial office
- Architectural style: Modernism
- Location: 1601 Elm Street, Dallas, Texas, U.S.
- Coordinates: 32.782025°N 96.798112°W
- Completed: 1982
- Owner: Pacific Elm Properties, a Woods Capital company
- Operator: Woods Capital Property Management, LLC

Height
- Roof: 197 m (646 ft)

Technical details
- Floor count: 50; 6 below ground
- Floor area: 1,410,300 ft^{2} (131,020 m^{2})

Design and construction
- Architect: HKS, Inc.
- Developer: Hunt Oil Company
- Structural engineer: HKS, Inc.
- Main contractor: Huber Hunt & Nichols

Santander Tower, formerly known as Thanksgiving Tower, is a 50-story, 197 m (646 ft) skyscraper at 1601 Elm Street adjacent to Thanks-Giving Square in downtown Dallas, Texas, United States. At its completion in 1982, it was the second tallest building in Dallas, surpassing Elm Place. One year later, with the completion of 1700 Pacific, it became the third tallest, and it is currently the 8th-tallest building in the city. The building is connected to the Dallas Pedestrian Network and the Bullington Truck Terminal. Santander Tower is owned and managed by Woods Capital, and it was designed by the architecture firm HKS Architects. Formerly known as the Thanks-Giving Tower, it was renamed in 2020 after Banco Santander.

In mid-2022 it was announced that 12 of the 50 floors will be converted into 228 residential units with building ownership citing post-pandemic housing demand and a weakened office market as the catalysts for the adaptive reuse project.

== Repositioning ==
In 2013, Woods Capital acquired the tower out of foreclosure. Woods began a repositioning campaign estimated at $45m to revitalize the building and surrounding areas. During this program the lobbies, plaza, mechanical systems, common areas, and other portions of the tower were all upgraded. Occupancy in the building increased because of the repositioning.

== See also ==
- List of tallest buildings in Dallas
