= Renaissance Dallas Hotel =

Skyscraper hotel in Dallas Texas

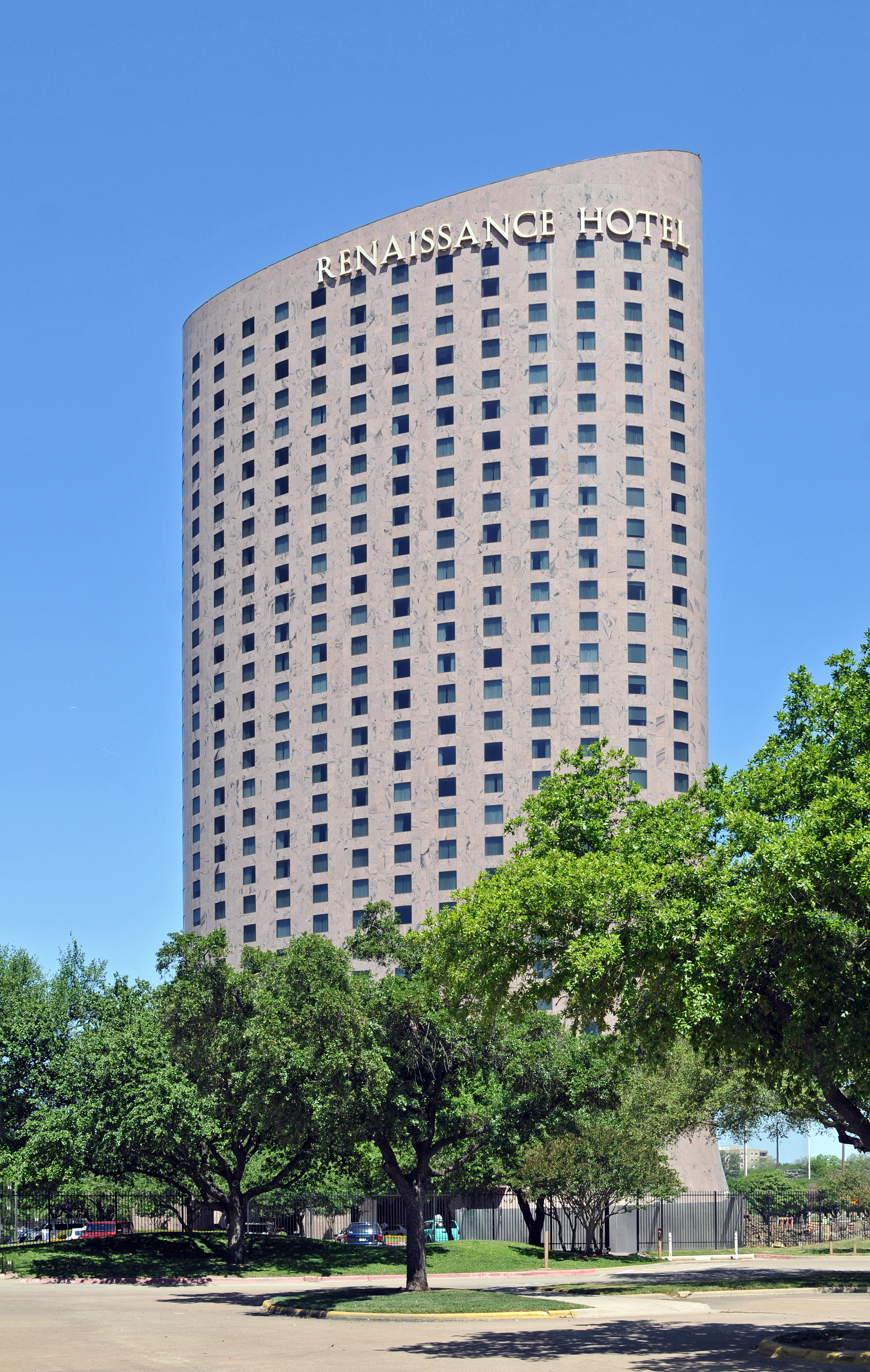
- Renaissance Dallas Hotel from the other side of Wycliff Ave
- Interactive map of the Renaissance Dallas Hotel area
- Former names: Stouffer Hotel; Wyndham Resorts

General information
- Status: Completed
- Type: Hotel
- Architectural style: Modernism
- Location: 2222 Stemmons Freeway; Dallas, Texas
- Coordinates: 32.8037°N 96.832°W
- Completed: 1983
- Management: Marriott International

Height
- Roof: 137.47 m (451.0 ft)

Technical details
- Floor count: 30

Design and construction
- Architect: Growald Architects {design}Dahl Braden Chapman

Other information
- Number of rooms: 484 rooms 30 suites

The Renaissance Dallas Hotel is a 30-story, 137.47 m (451.0 ft) granite skyscraper hotel in Dallas, Texas. The hotel has 514 guest rooms and was completed in 1983, when it opened as a Wyndham hotel. The Renaissance Hotel currently stands as the 24th-tallest building in Dallas. The building was designed by architect Dahl Braden Chapman. Variously nicknamed "The Bic", "The Bic Lighter", "The Stick", "The Speedstick", and "The Mennen Speedstick."

The Renaissance Dallas Hotel used to hold the world's second largest free-standing chandelier in the world. It was replaced in 2011. The hotel is also known for its distinctive elliptical shape and diagonal roofline. The slanted roofline provides for a large curtain wall. This shelters the building's open-air rooftop swimming pool, which is one of the highest pools in Dallas. The building's unique design led to it being prominently featured in a cover image of a 1984 issue of National Geographic.

The structure initially opened in 1983 as a Wyndham hotel, but was renamed in 1987 after Stouffer parent company Nestlé approved its acquisition in 1987. Stouffer Hotels Corporation took the hotel over from real estate developer Trammel Crow via a controlling joint ownership venture and managing contract agreement. The building was acquired by Marriott International in 1997 with its Renaissance brand.

== See also ==
- List of tallest buildings and structures in Dallas
