= Trammell Crow Center =

Skyscraper located in downtown Dallas, Texas

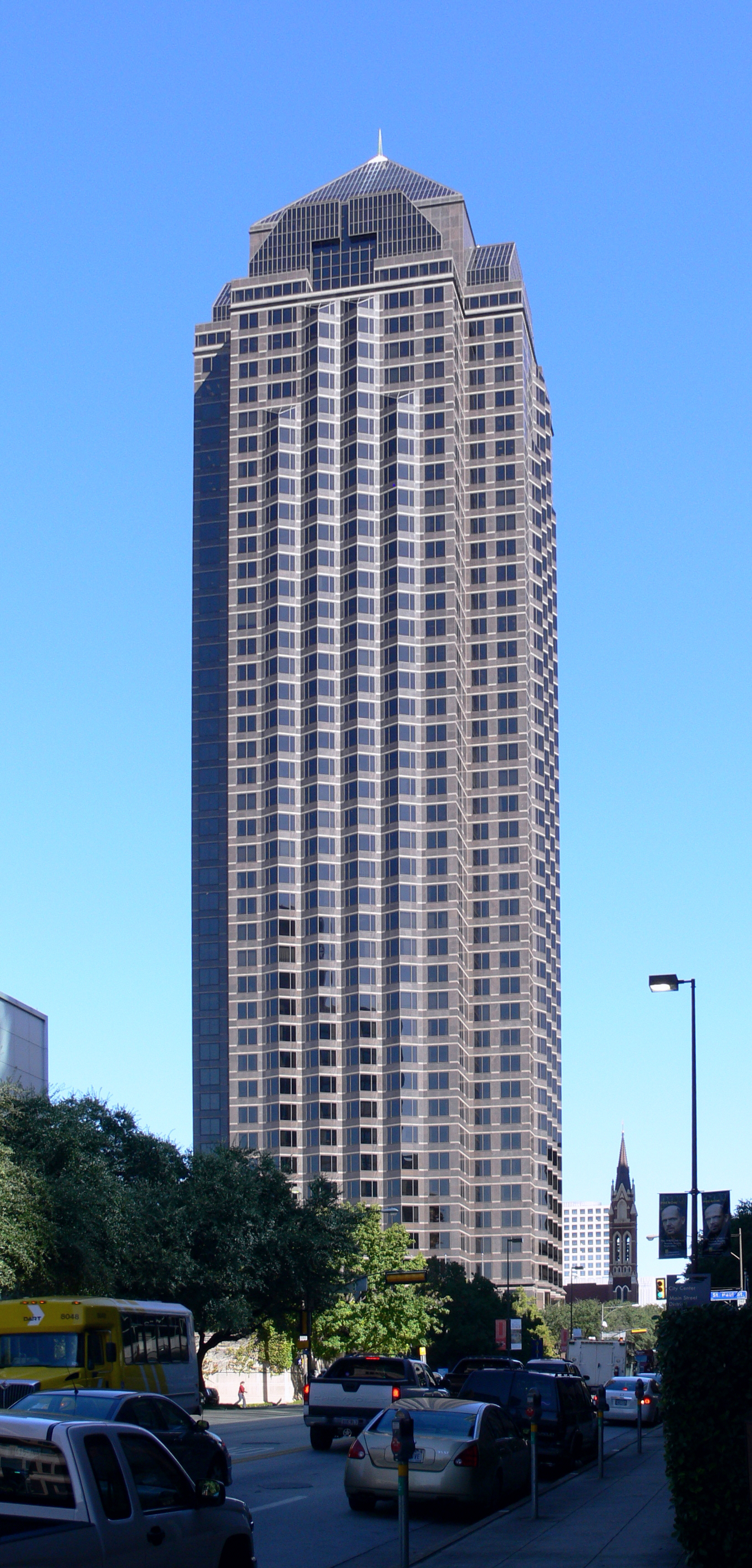
- Interactive map of the Trammell Crow Center area
- Alternative names: Trammell Crow Tower; LTV Center

General information
- Type: Commercial offices
- Location: 2001 Ross Avenue; Dallas, Texas
- Coordinates: 32.78750°N 96.7992°W
- Construction started: 1982
- Completed: 1985
- Owner: Crescent Ross Avenue Realty Investors, L.P.
- Management: Stream Realty

Height
- Roof: 209 m (686 ft)

Technical details
- Floor count: 50 above ground 6 below ground
- Floor area: 1,128,327 sq ft (104,825.0 m^{2})
- Lifts/elevators: 30

Design and construction
- Architects: Richard Keating of SOM Skidmore, Owings & Merrill; Foster and Meier
- Developer: Trammell Crow
- Structural engineer: Skidmore, Owings & Merrill

Trammell Crow Center is a 50-story postmodern skyscraper at 2001 Ross Avenue in the Arts District of downtown Dallas, Texas. With a structural height of 708 ft (216 m), and 686 ft (209 m) to the roof, it is the sixth-tallest building in Dallas and the 18th-tallest in the state. The tower was designed by the architecture firm Skidmore, Owings and Merrill, and has a polished and flamed granite façade, with 1,200,000 sq ft (110,000 m^{2}) of office space. It was originally built as the new headquarters of Ling-Temco-Vought, which had outgrown its previous headquarters at 1600 Pacific Tower.

Trammell & Margaret Crow Collection of Asian Art, an arts venue showcasing artwork owned by the Crows, is at the building's base.

The building underwent widescale renovations, beginning in 2017, to attract a newer workforce and update amenities, including over 20,000 square feet of new retail space, a conference center, and gym on the bottom two floors. This renovation is being undertaken by Stream Realty.

== Major tenants ==
- Goldman Sachs
- Stream Realty Partners
- Vinson and Elkins
- Baker Botts
- Citigroup
- Invesco
- Gibson Dunn

== See also ==
- List of tallest buildings in Dallas
- List of tallest buildings in Texas
