= 2100 Ross Avenue =

Skyscraper in Dallas, Texas, U.S.

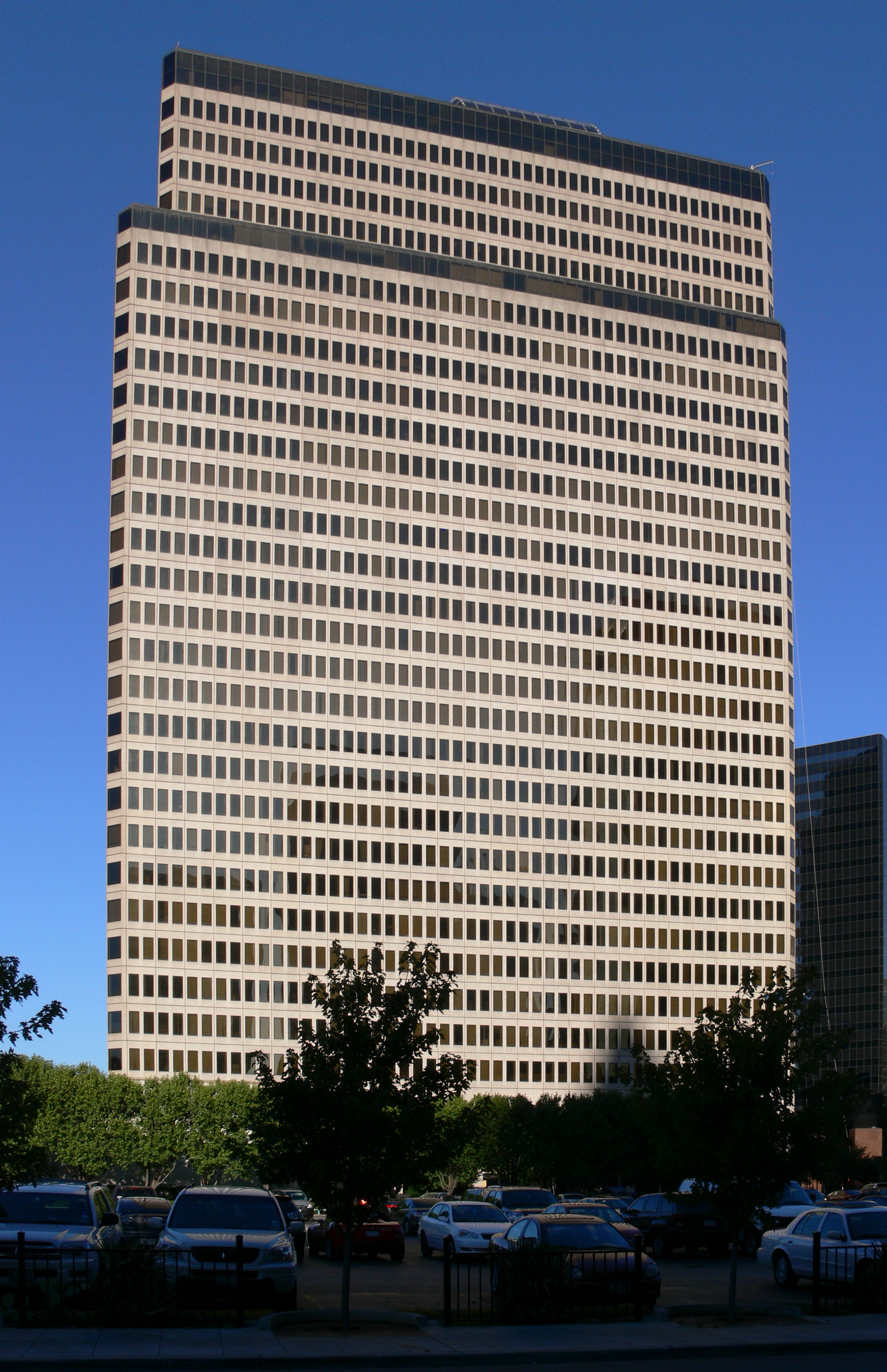

General information
- Type: Office
- Location: 2100 Ross Avenue or 2121 San Jacinto Street; Dallas, Texas, United States
- Coordinates: 32.787521°N 96.797609°W
- Completed: 1982
- Opening: 1982
- Owner: Pacific Elm Properties (2022-Present) www.pacificelm.com

Height
- Roof: 456 feet (139 m)

Technical details
- Floor count: 33
- Floor area: 844,000 square feet (78,400 m^{2})

Design and construction
- Main contractor: The Beck Group

2100 Ross Avenue (simply 2100 Ross, formerly San Jacinto Tower) is a 33-story postmodern skyscraper located at 2100 Ross Avenue/2121 San Jacinto Street in the City Center District of downtown Dallas, Texas, United States. The structure stands at a height of 456 feet (139 m) and contains 844,000 square feet (78,400 m^{2}) of office space.

In 2012, the building was bought for US$59 million by Cousins Properties, an Atlanta based real estate company. In 2013, the company announced that they would renovate the building's interior. The project includes lobby improvements, high-tech installations, and security upgrades. It was completed in 2014.

The building was then owned by Thomas Dundon who purchased it in 2015 to house his financial firm Dundon Capital Partners. He later sold the building in 2019 following the closure of the Alliance of American Football, a sports league in which he was heavily invested.

In 2020, law firm Thompson Coburn moved to the building, occupied 23,177 square feet (2,153.2 m^{2}) of its total floor area.

== In popular culture ==
The San Jacinto Tower was used for establishing shots for fictional location of the Oil Barons Club In Season 7 of the original TV series Dallas.

== See also ==
- List of tallest buildings in Dallas
