= 1600 Pacific Tower =

Skyscraper in Dallas Texas

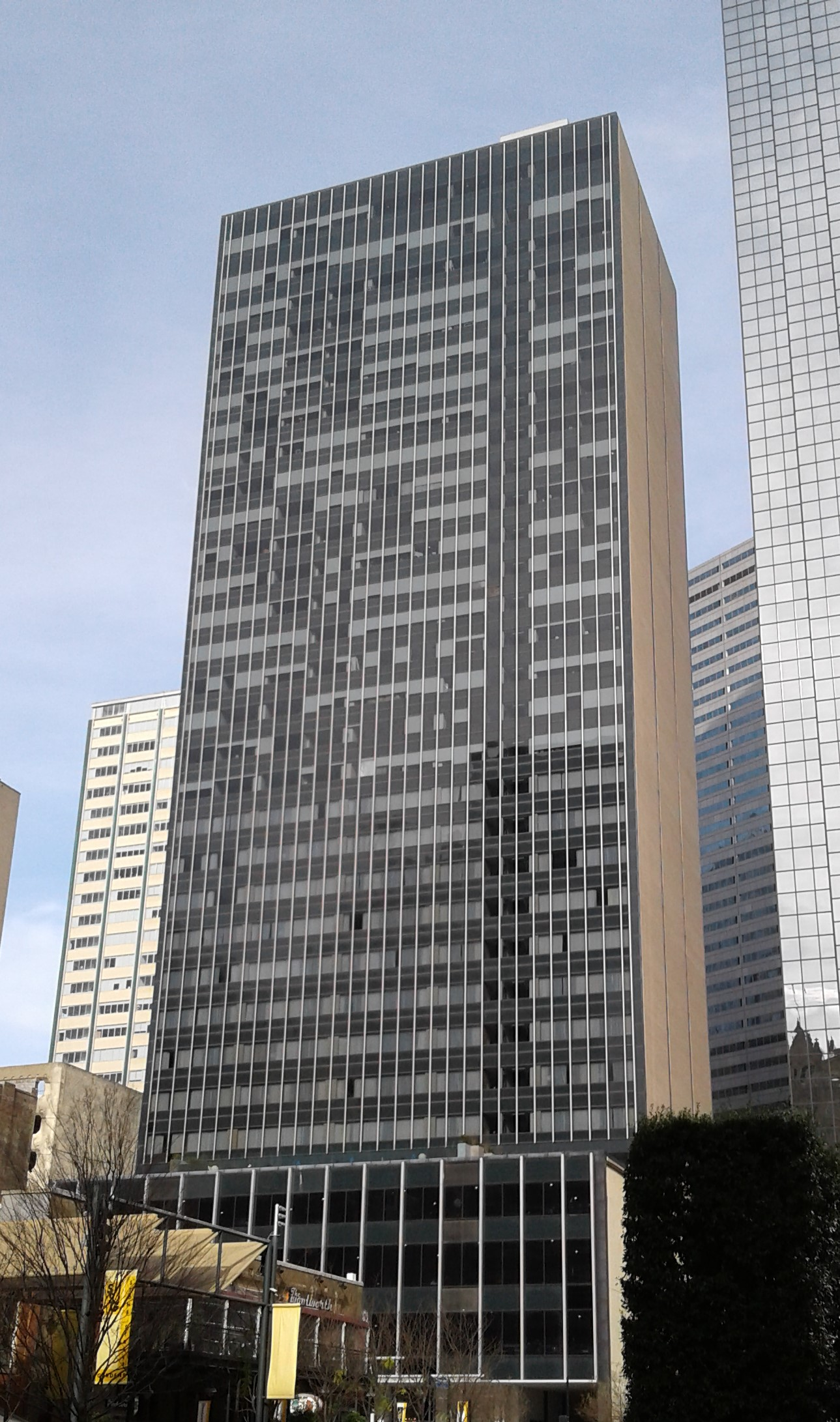
- The 1600 Pacific Tower building in 2018
- Interactive map of the 1600 Pacific Tower area

General information
- Status: Completed
- Type: Office
- Location: 1600 Pacific Tower; Dallas, Texas, USA
- Coordinates: 32°46′55″N 96°47′57″W
- Opening: 1964
- Cost: $16 million
- Owner: HRI Properties

Height
- Roof: 434 ft (132 m)

Technical details
- Floor count: 33
- Lifts/elevators: 8

Design and construction
- Architects: Harwood K. Smith, Dales Young Foster
- Main contractor: The Beck Group

1600 Pacific Tower, also known as the LTV Tower (and also originally National Bank of Commerce Building), is a skyscraper in the City Center District of Dallas, Texas, USA. The building rises 434 feet (132 meters). The structure contains 33 floors, made up originally of office space (but now consists of a hotel and apartments), standing as the 29th-tallest building in the city. The building is adjacent to Thanks-Giving Square and was, for a time, connected to the Dallas Pedestrian Network.

== History ==
The building was designed in 1961 by architects Harwood K. Smith and Dales Young Foster and opened in 1964 as the fifth tallest building in Dallas.

Banking facilities for the National Bank of Commerce were located on the second and third floors, while the 28-story tower portion of the building contained the executive headquarters for LTV (Ling-Temco-Vought), Electro-Science Investors, and American Life Insurance Company plus other leasable space. 2 levels of parking are located below the structure.

The ground floor contained a marble and granite pedestrian mall connecting Elm Street and Pacific Avenue, open 24 hours a day for pedestrian passage. An innovative motor bank, called "Teller-Vision", allowed drive-up bank customers to conduct business over a closed circuit television system. Terraces and gardens were located on the roof of the 3-story base, and the top floor of the building contained the private Lancers Club.

The building's facade was covered with 125,000 square feet (11,600 m^{2}) of dark glass with strips of aluminum molding and contained the world's largest electronic signboard. Thirty windows on each of the twenty-five floors were individually controlled and could spell out different messages. It often spelled out "LTV", and even had a figure of Big Tex in lights during the State Fair.

The quality of the building's construction has been debated over the years. During construction, a section of masonry broke loose and tons of bricks crashed through the roof of a neighboring building. Shortly after opening some of the windows cracked due to heat.

In 1970 a bomb threat caused evacuation of the building.

The building was sold in 1968, and in 1975 the building was sold again to Dresser, Inc. The building went through a series of successive owners intending to convert it into residences, but because of economic conditions no plans immediately came to fruition. In 2010, work by a San Antonio-based developer began to renovate the building—which was to be renamed The Grand Ricchi—for residential and office condo use.

In 2014 a new plan was announced, to convert the building to a combination Hilton Garden Inn and apartments. The hotel lobby would be on the first floor, parking on floors 2–4, the hotel on floors 5–14, and the apartments on 15–32. The apartments began occupancy in July 2015 and the hotel opened in September 2015.
