= 1700 Pacific =

Skyscraper in Dallas Texas

1700 Pacific Avenue
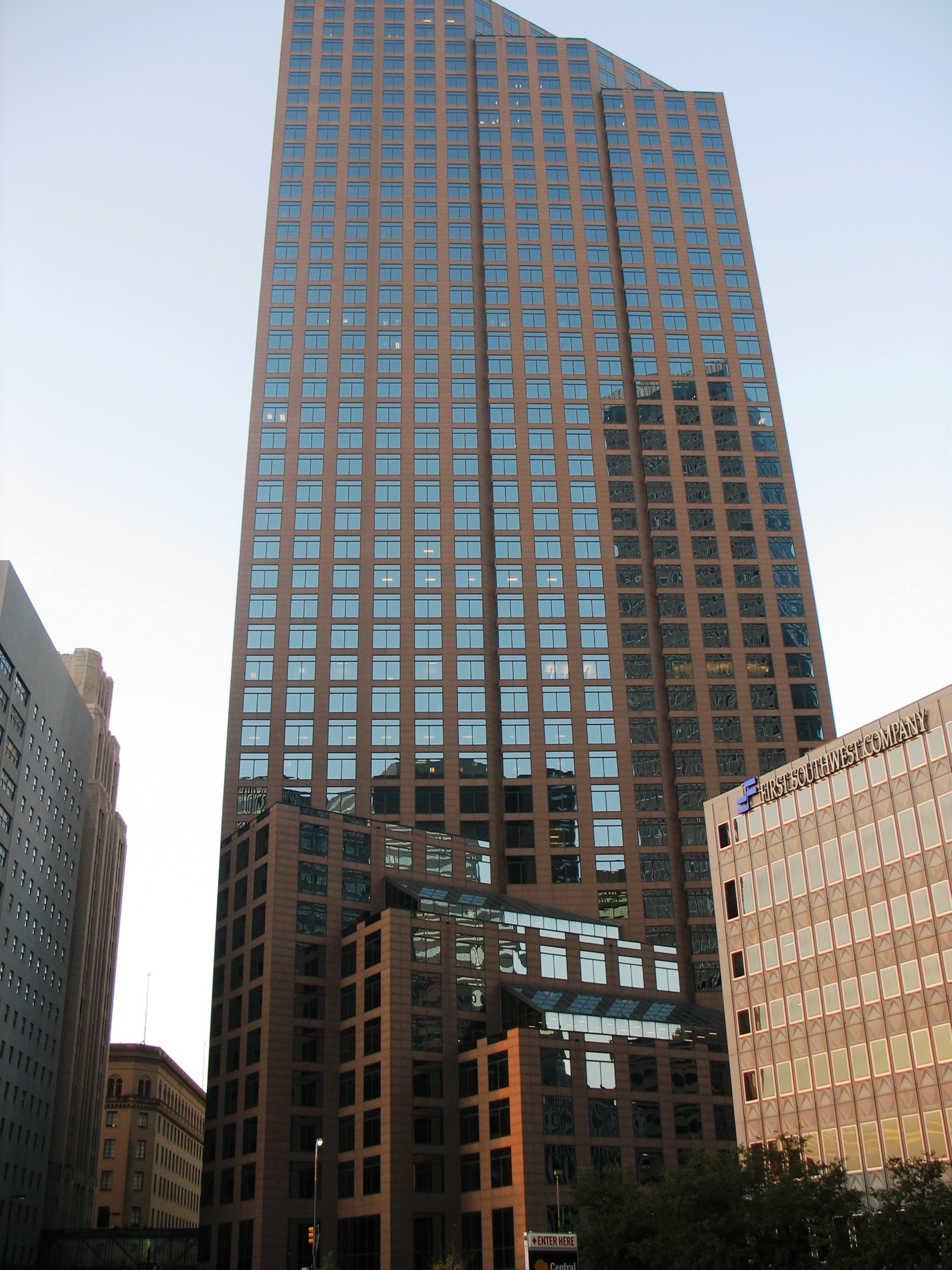
- Interactive map of the 1700 Pacific Avenue area
- Former names: First City Centre

General information
- Type: Commercial offices
- Location: 1700 Pacific Avenue; Dallas, Texas
- Coordinates: 32.7823°N 96.7966°W
- Construction started: 1981
- Completed: 1983
- Owner: Olymbec
- Operator: Lincoln Property Company

Height
- Roof: 199 m (653 ft)

Technical details
- Floor count: 49
- Floor area: 124,932 m^{2} (1,344,760 sq ft)

Design and construction
- Architect: WZMH Architects
- Developer: Cadillac-Fairview

1700 Pacific is a skyscraper located at 1700 Pacific Avenue in the City Center District of Dallas, Texas. The building rises 655 ft (200 m) and contains 49 floors of office space. It is currently the seventh tallest building in the city and was the second tallest in the city when it was completed in 1983, trailing only Renaissance Tower.

The land on which 1700 Pacific sits was once two triangular blocks separated by Live Oak Street. In 1977, one of the triangular blocks was purchased by Dallas Transit Board for a major transit interchange on a proposed underground transit system.

The architect for the Tower was WZMH Architects. Berkeley First City L.P. first owned the building while Jones Lang LaSalle leased the building. In 2008, Jones Lang LaSalle announced that a 25,000 square feet (2,300 m^{2}) fitness center named "Elevation" would move into 1700 Pacific. In 2011, the building was renovated.

By August 2013, Dallas Business Journal listed the fitness center among the building's facilities. The newspaper also reported that the building was put up for sale. In July 2014, it was bought by Canada-based Olymbec at an undisclosed price. In 2026, it was valued at $54 million and was 33% leased.

== See also ==
- List of tallest buildings in Dallas
