= Sheraton Dallas Hotel =

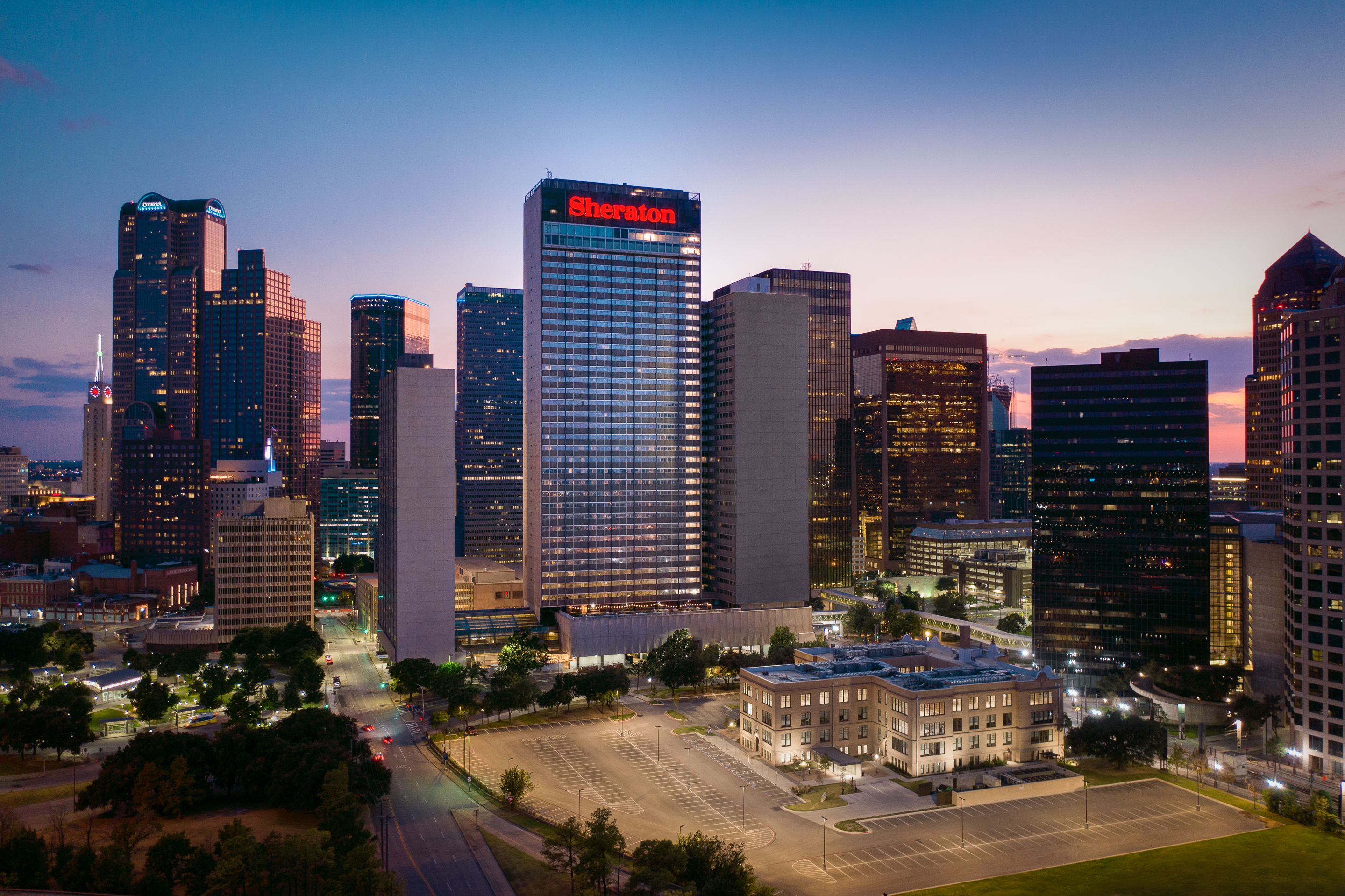
- Hotel chain: Sheraton

General information
- Location: 400 N. Olive Street; Dallas, Texas
- Coordinates: 32.785066°N 96.794884°W
- Opening: April 12, 1959 (entire Southland Center complex became a hotel in 1998)
- Cost: US$35 million

Height
- Height: 167.64 m (550.0 ft)

Technical details
- Floor count: 42

Design and construction
- Architects: Welton Becket & Associates

Other information
- Number of rooms: 1,840
- Number of suites: 242 Suites: Executive Suite; Dallas Suite; Jr. Suites; 22 Presidential Suites
- Number of restaurants: Draft Sports Bar & Lounge; Open Palette; The Parlor

Website
- www.marriott.com/hotels/travel/daldh-sheraton-dallas-hotel/

The Sheraton Dallas Hotel, formerly the Adam's Mark Hotel and originally the Southland Center, is a complex of International Style skyscrapers located in the City Center District of downtown Dallas, Texas. The hotel is the largest and second tallest hotel in Dallas and Texas with 1,840 guest rooms and 260,000 sq ft (24,000 m^{2}) of meeting space. It has been host to pop culture conventions such as Project A-Kon and TwiCon.

== History ==
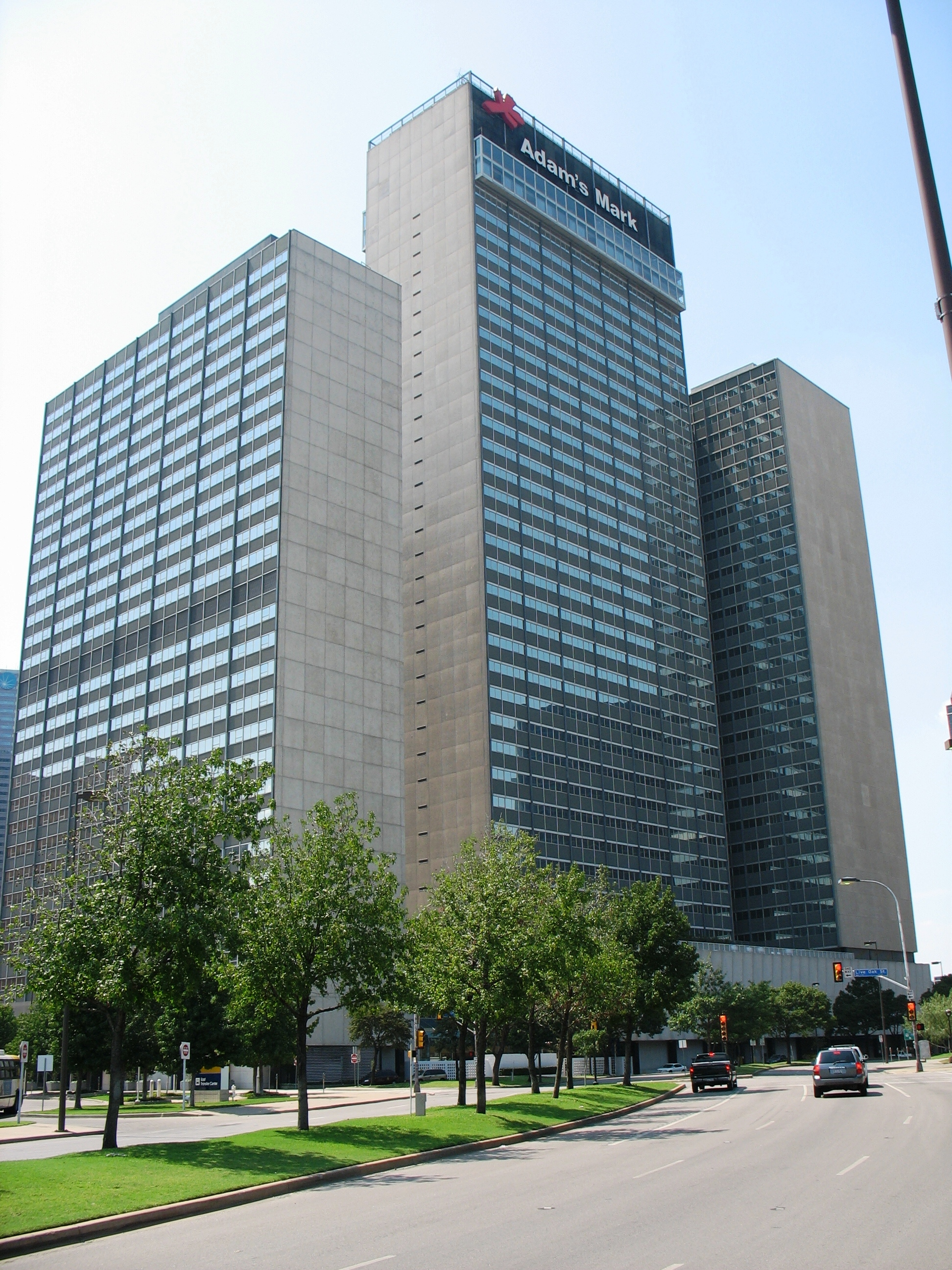
The hotel in 2007, as the Adam's Mark

The Southland Center complex was designed by Los Angeles-based Welton Becket & Associates for the Southland Life Insurance Company. When groundbreaking took place in 1955, the complex was compared to Manhattan's Rockefeller Center, as Southland Center was the first mixed-use project in downtown Dallas containing hotel and office space.

Southland Center was the second major development in the northeast end of downtown now known as the City Center District. The original two buildings, completed in 1958, consisted of the 42-story 550-foot (170 m) center tower, the Southland Life Building, and the 28 story 353-foot (108 m) south tower, the 510-room Sheraton-Dallas Hotel. Celebrities Johnny Weissmuller and June Lockhart appeared at the dedication ceremony in 1959. In early 1981, the 31 story (448 ft) north Skyway Tower was added as additional office space. All three buildings are rectangular slab structures resting on a common base. The facade was covered with curtain walls of glass and 1,000+ spandrel panels of lightweight precast concrete faced with blue Italian glass mosaic tiles.

The Southland Life Building overtook the Republic National Bank Building and became from 1959 to 1964 the tallest in the city and the tallest building west of the Mississippi River. Its height was later surpassed in the city by Republic Center Tower II. For many years after the building's opening, the most exclusive restaurant in downtown Dallas was the Chaparral Club on the 37th floor, and an observation deck occupied the top of the tower.

Southland Life vacated the complex when Cityplace Center opened in 1988. The hotel tower left the Sheraton chain in 1990 and was renamed the Southland Center Hotel and then the Harvey Hotel in 1994, when the Dallas-based Bristol Hotel Co. assumed management. In 1990, a central tower addition of 25 floors and bay windows was proposed to make the complex competitive to newer projects going up in the city. However, the office towers remained vacant until 1996, when HBE Corp. purchased the entire 1.5 million-square-foot complex from New York Life, as well as the entire block across the street, for a total of $40 million. At a further cost of $170 million, HBE redeveloped all three towers into one large hotel and built a convention center on the adjacent block, linked by skybridges. The Harvey Hotel tower remained open throughout the work. HBE placed the finished hotel within their Adam's Mark chain, naming it the Adam's Mark Dallas. The 1844-room hotel opened in October 1998. DART's adjacent light rail line and Pearl Station were major factors in converting the complex into a first-rate convention facility. A parking garage and 3-story convention building were constructed on an adjoining block to the southwest, and the building's facade of glass mosaics was painted gray during the building's conversion.

In 2007, the Adam's Mark Dallas was among hotels in the chain sold to Oxford Lodging Group who re-branded it as a Sheraton, returning the complex to the hotel's original name from nearly fifty years before, the Sheraton Dallas Hotel. A $90 million project began in 2009 to renovate guestrooms, public spaces, and the convention center. In summer 2018, the hotel launched another renovation which added a rooftop garden, new entrance and redesigns of public spaces, meeting and guest rooms. The work finished in November 2019.
