= Chase Tower (Dallas) =

Skyscraper in Dallas, Texas

Dallas Arts Tower
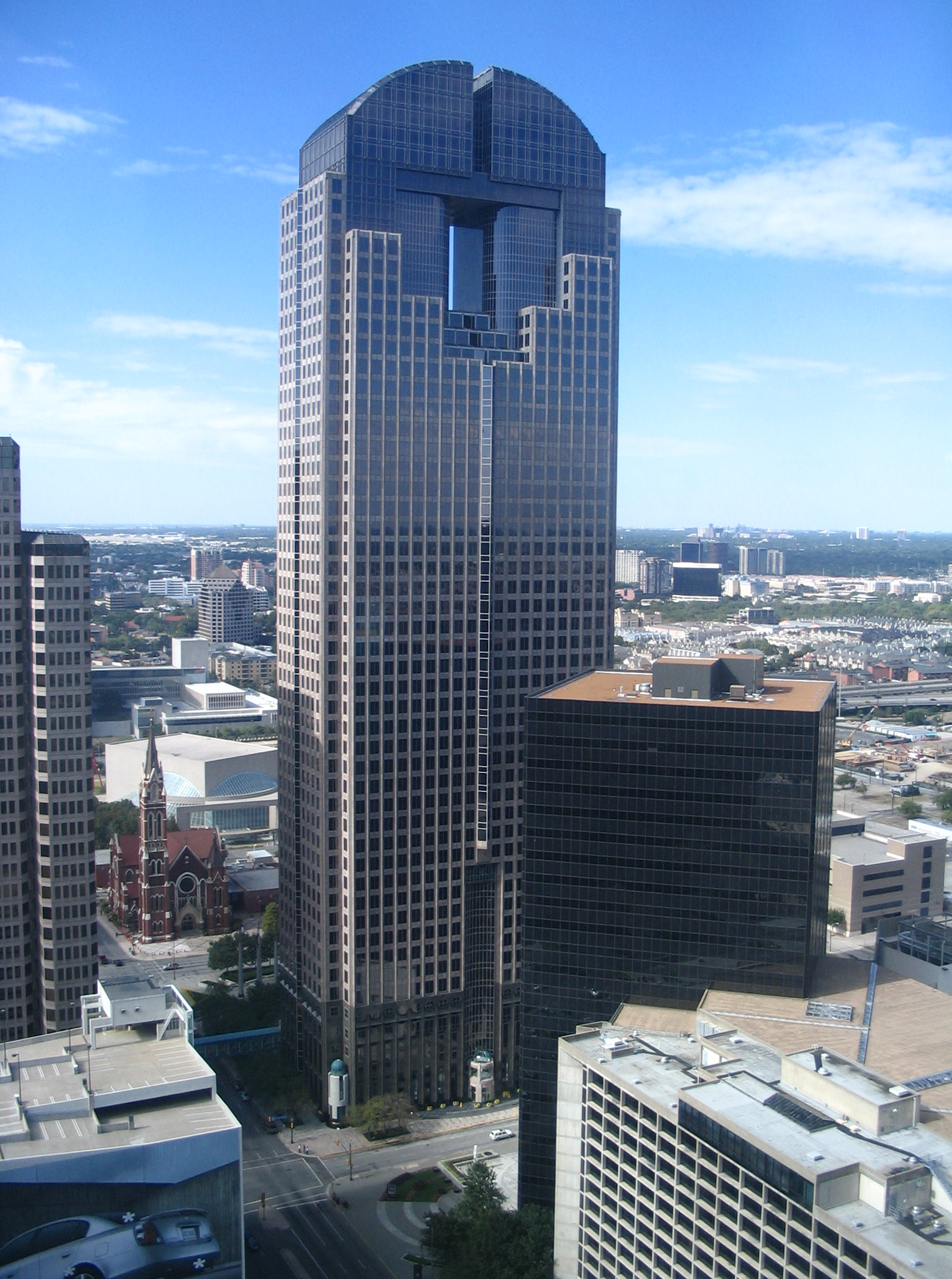
- Interactive map of the Dallas Arts Tower area
- Former names: Chase Tower
- Alternative names: Dallas Arts Tower JPMorgan Chase Tower; Texas Commerce Tower

General information
- Type: Commercial offices
- Architectural style: Postmodern
- Location: 2200 Ross Avenue; Dallas, Texas; 75201
- Coordinates: 32.7878°N 96.7966°W
- Completed: 1987
- Cost: US$300 million
- Owner: Fortis Property Group
- Operator: Fortis Property Group Michael Dockins, Senior Property Manager

Height
- Roof: 225 m (738 ft)

Technical details
- Floor count: 55
- Floor area: 1,296,400 sq ft (120,440 m^{2})
- Lifts/elevators: 32

Design and construction
- Architect: Skidmore, Owings & Merrill
- Developer: Trammell Crow
- Main contractor: Austin Commercial

Website
- www.chasetowerdallas.com

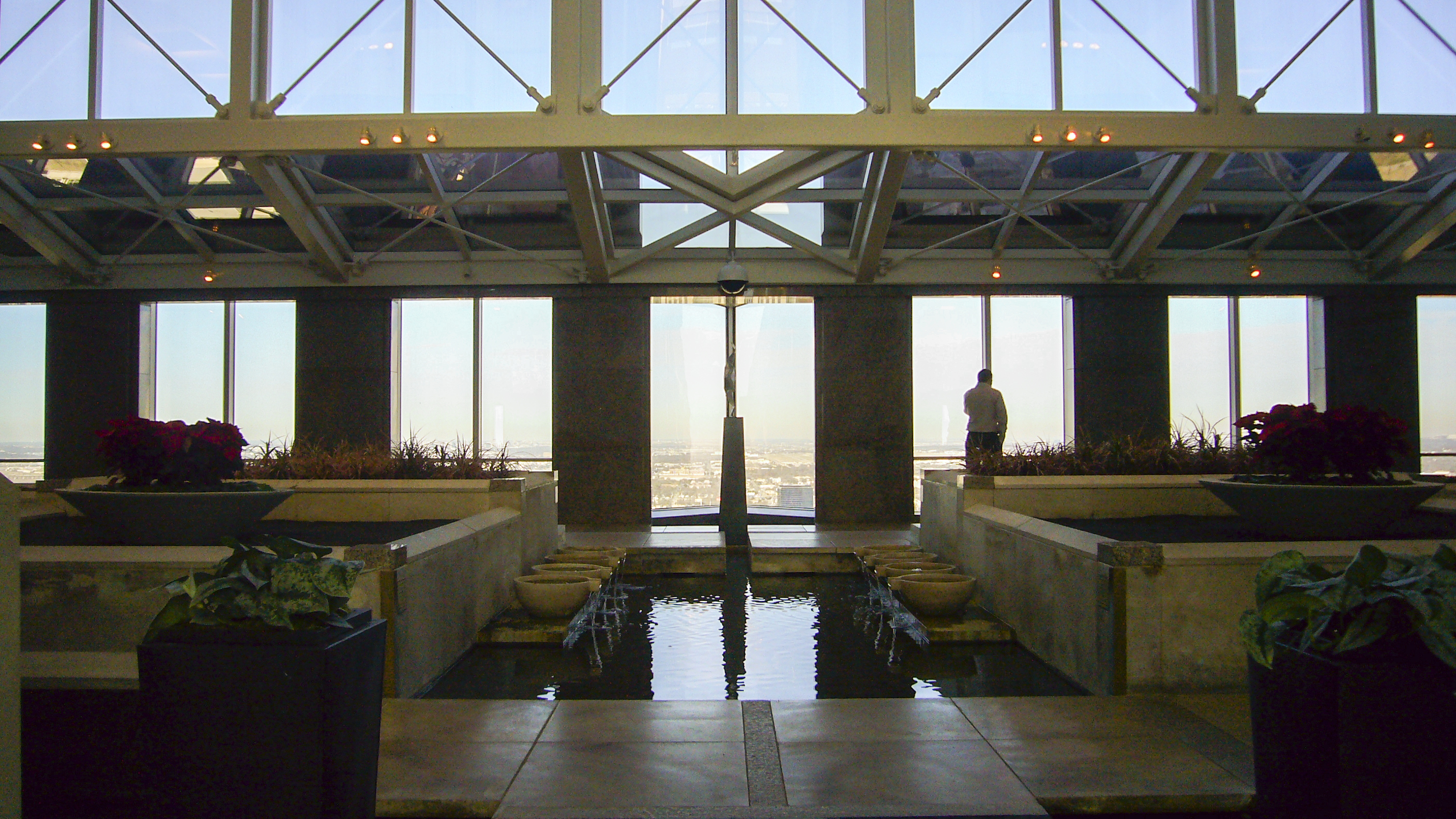
Chase Tower Dallas 40F Sky Lobby in 2007, is no longer open to the public and the planters have been removed since 2018

Dallas Arts Tower (formerly Chase Tower) is a 225 m (738 ft), 55-story postmodern skyscraper at 2200 Ross Avenue in the City Center District of downtown Dallas, Texas, United States.

Although it is the fourth tallest skyscraper in the city, if one were to exclude antennas and spires, it would be the third. It is also the 13th tallest building in Texas. The building was designed by Skidmore, Owings & Merrill and was completed in 1987. The building also formerly housed the Dallas Petroleum Club, a business and social club located on the 39th and 40th floors.

This building is known for its unique architecture which includes a curved glass top and a 6-story hole in the center of the building near the top and is nicknamed the "Keyhole Building" by some people.

== History ==
When Ion Storm existed, its corporate headquarters were in Suite 5400, 22,000-square-foot (2,000 m^{2}) of space in a penthouse suite on the 54th floor, the top floor, of the tower. Lisa Chadderdon of Fast Company said that the penthouse location was "unusual". For the first ten years after the construction of the JPMorgan Chase Tower, the penthouse location had been unleased.

Hines REIT bought the building in 2007 naming Hines Interests Limited Partnership the property manager.

The company Autonomy etalk planned to move its employees to the Chase Tower from Las Colinas, Irving in 2008.

Deloitte has an office in the tower which had 950 employees in late 2009. In early 2009, Deloitte announced that it planned to consolidate its Downtown operations and its operations in Irving, Texas. Initially, there would have been a multimillion-dollar advantage to Deloitte if it moved to Irving. The City of Dallas proposed an economic grant to Deloitte if it decided to stay in Downtown Dallas. Therefore, Deloitte agreed to extend its lease in the tower for fifteen years, beginning in 2011. Deloitte will have at least 1,111 employees in the JPMorgan Chase Tower.

In 2015 and 2016 renovations were made to many of the common areas including the main lobby and mezzanine level of the building. Lighting and furniture upgrades were included along with a remodel of the existing sundries shop and Starbucks coffee kiosk. An executive conference center was added on the 40th floor and a video conference center was added on level 38.

The rotunda which sits on the property's north plaza was remodeled as a fitness center exclusive to Chase Tower tenants. It includes cardio, free weight and circuit training equipment as well as a studio center for group fitness and spinning class workouts. Men's and women's locker rooms with full shower facilities and day lockers were added in the lower level of the rotunda. Tenants may also opt for an executive locker that provides full-time locker use of a larger locker, changing area and executive lounge. The fitness center is staffed with a full-time manager and day porter Monday through Friday.

The 40th floor Sky Lobby at the base of the "keyhole" contained a little-known observation area which is no longer available to the public.

Fortis Property Group acquired the building in August 2016.

In 2023, it was announced that the building would be renamed the Dallas Arts Tower and that it would go under renovations to include an art gallery and two new restaurants.

== In popular culture ==
Exterior and interior location shoots were used in season two of the 2012 television reboot series Dallas. The tower and penthouse office space stood in as home of the fictional Barnes Global/Ewing Global and the Dallas Petroleum Club stood in as itself in several episodes.

The tower suffers a direct hit from an asteroid fragment in the 1997 made-for-TV movie Asteroid, which splits the building in half and causes the skyscraper's iconic "keyhole" crown to come crashing to the ground.

Establishing shots of the Chase Tower are used in the sitcom Cristela.

== See also ==
- List of tallest buildings in Dallas
- Tallest buildings in Texas
- List of tallest buildings in the United States
