= Baker Hotel (Dallas) =

Hotel in Dallas, Texas, U.S.

Coordinates: 32.77999°N 96.79941°W

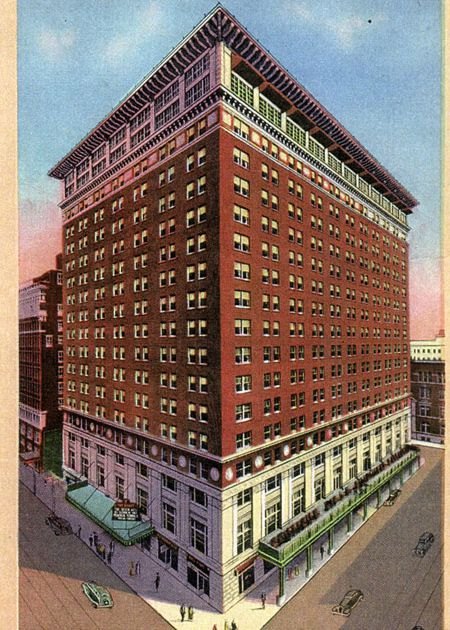
- Interactive map of the Baker Hotel area

General information
- Status: Demolished
- Location: Commerce & Akard Street, Dallas, Texas
- Opened: October 25, 1925; 99 years ago
- Renovated: 1946, 1972
- Demolished: June 29, 1980; 45 years ago
- Owner: Baker Hotel Company, Cemgil Reality

Technical details
- Floor count: 19

Other information
- Number of rooms: 600-700

The Baker Hotel was a former grand hotel located in the heart of downtown, Dallas, Texas, across the landmark Adolphus Hotel and the Magnolia Hotel. Its interiors were remodeled in 1972 after a fire, and was imploded in 1980 to make way for the Whitacre Tower, which occupies its site today.

== History ==
=== Opening and events ===
T. B. Baker, head of the Baker Hotel Company, built the hotel in 1925. Opening night, October 25, 1925, was marked by a Gala dinner dance. According to a Dallas Morning News report, the keys to the building were officially thrown away at 6:00 Saturday morning, "thus will be symbolized the fact that the portals of the building from hence forward are never to be closed day or right." The opening was also the 30th anniversary of the opening of the old Oriental which has been torn down for the Baker to be built on the same site.

The Baker was the home of WFAA radio, the Peacock Terrace, Crystal Ballroom, and the place to play on Texas-OU weekends. Its ballrooms were used for debutantes, movie stars, and society members. The Peacock Terrace Ballroom opened in 1925, and the big name swing bands of the 20s and 30s played for Dallasites. The Idlewild Ball for Debutantes was held annually in the Crystal Ballroom. The Dallas Petroleum Club met at the Baker. The Mural Room was the main luncheon site for many.

On the morning of November 22, 1963, the hotel hosted former Vice President (and future President) Richard Nixon, as well as movie star Joan Crawford. He left the city via Love Field an hour before the arrival of Air Force One.

The brownstone building catered to its patrons with style and luxury for 54 years. During that time the building sustained several mishaps.

=== Incidents and further sale ===
On June 21, 1946, an explosion ripped through the basement, injuring 3, and 9 died, though later reports say that 11 died.

The Baker's owned the hotel until 1949 when it was sold to Dallas Rupe & Sons, investment bankers. The new management retained the Baker style. In 1970 the building was sold again to Cemgil Reality.

A fire in 1971 destroyed the upper floors, and after the fire, the building was once again remodeled in 1972. Each time these incidents occurred the building was remodeled and always managed to remain elegant. Only age and new ownership finally ended the style of the Baker Hotel.

Seven years later the hotels area was included in a block purchase by Southwestern Bell Telephone.

=== Demolition ===
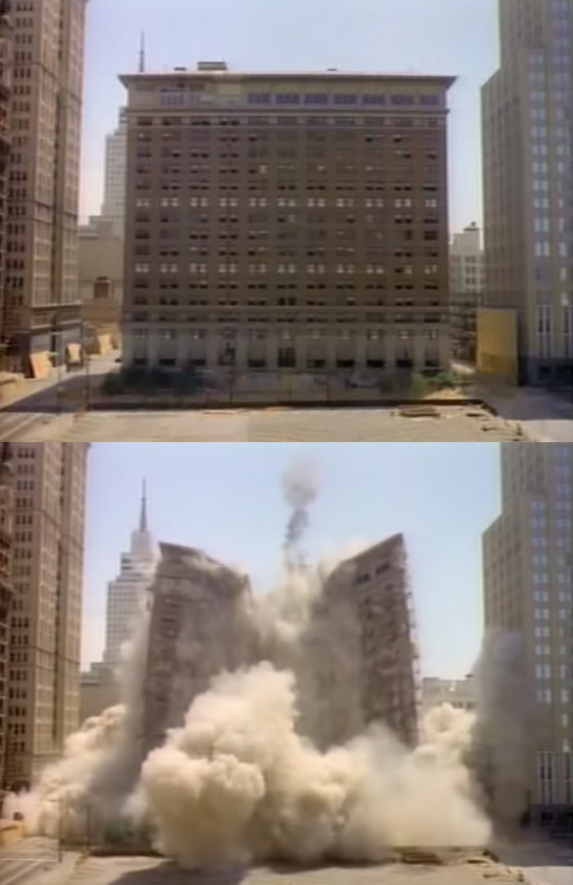
The Baker Hotel on June 29th, 1980. The image above shows the hotel seconds before destruction, and the image below shows the hotel crumbling to the ground.

The new owners decided the 600-700 room hotel could not be economically converted for their needs. A sale of interior goods from chandeliers to doorknobs took place in September 1979. The Baker Hotel, along with two adjacent office buildings and a smokestack were imploded on June 29, 1980, and in seconds the once grand hotel was in complete ruin. The site was cleared and in its place a modern skyscraper known as One Bell Plaza was planned to be built.

Construction on the building began in 1982 and was completed in 1984, with 37 stories. The building is now known as One AT&T Plaza or Whitearce Tower, serving as the main headquarters of AT&T.

== Gallery ==
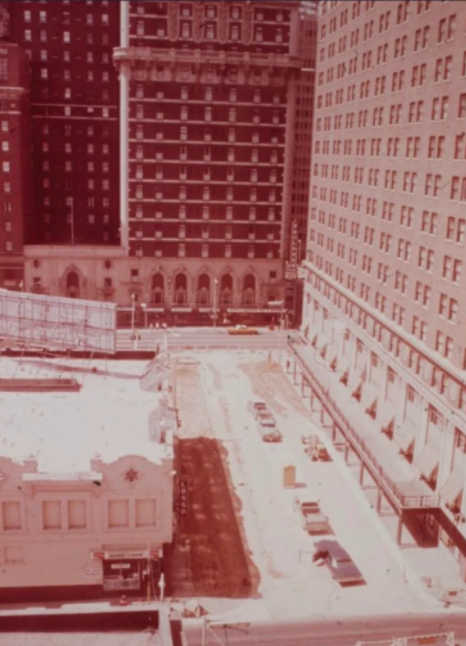
The Adolphus Hotel and Baker Hotel as seen in the 1970s

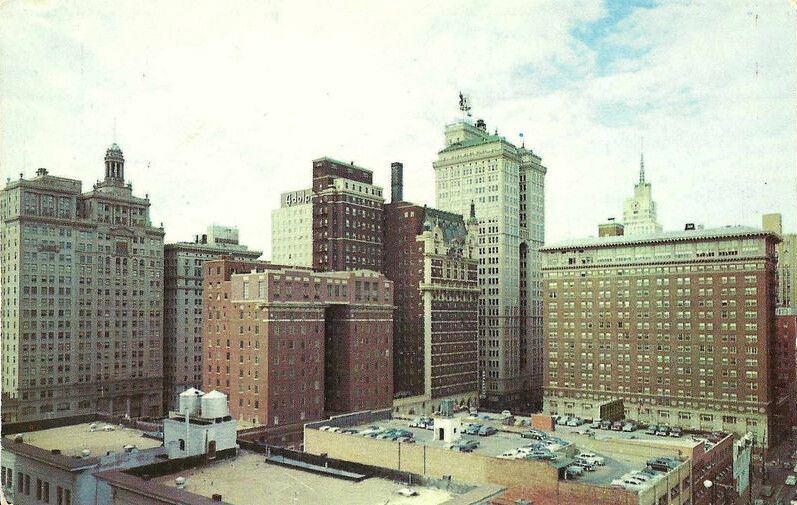
The Baker as formerly seen in the skyline of Dallas
