= Bank of America Plaza (Dallas) =

Skyscraper in Texas, US

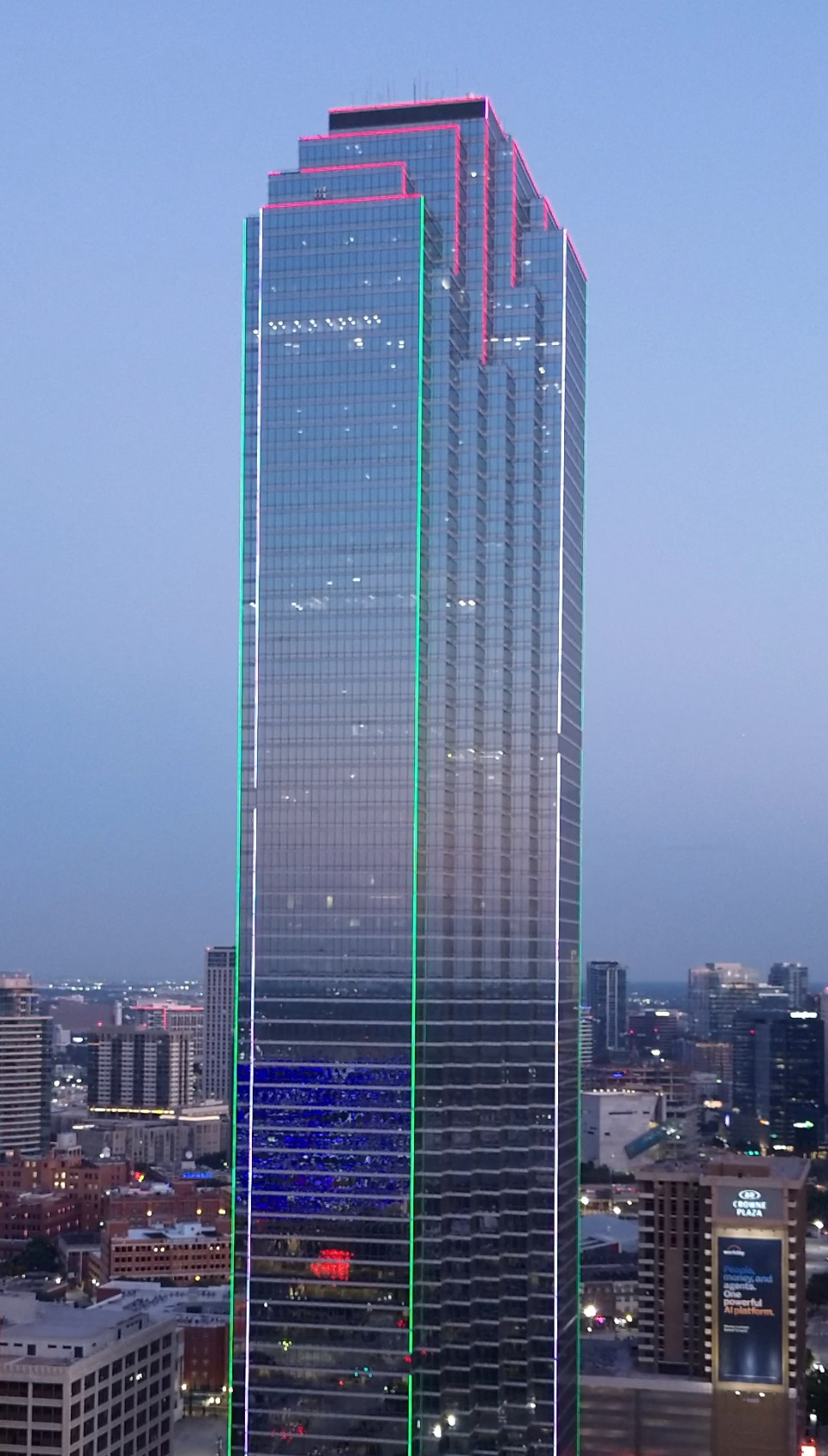
- The Bank of America Plaza in 2025
- Former names: Dallas Main Center; Interfirst Bank Plaza; Republic Bank Plaza; First Republic Bank Plaza; NCNB Plaza; NationsBank Plaza

Record height
- Tallest in Dallas since 1985^{[I]}
- Preceded by: Renaissance Tower

General information
- Type: Commercial offices
- Location: 901 Main Street; Dallas, Texas; 75202
- Coordinates: 32.7799°N 96.8038°W
- Construction started: 1983
- Completed: 1985
- Cost: US$146 million
- Owner: Dallas Main LP
- Operator: JLL Real Estate Company

Height
- Architectural: 921 ft (280.7 m)
- Roof: 915 ft (279 m)
- Observatory: 881 ft (268.4 m)

Technical details
- Floor count: 74
- Floor area: 1,844,000 sq ft (171,300 m^{2})
- Lifts/elevators: 4

Design and construction
- Architect: JPJ Architects
- Structural engineer: Brockette Davis Drake; LeMessurier Consultants

Website
- baplaza.com

Bank of America Plaza is a 72-story, 921-foot (280.7 m) late-modernist skyscraper located in the Main Street District in the downtown core of Dallas, Texas, United States. It is the tallest skyscraper in the city, the 3rd tallest in Texas and the 45th tallest in the United States. It contains 1,900,000 sq ft (180,000 m^{2}) of office space.

== History ==
The building was designed by JPJ Architects and developed by Bramalea Limited of Brampton, Ontario. Canada. The original owner was a joint venture arrangement including Prudential Insurance, Bramalea Limited, and First National Bank of Dallas under parent company InterFirst Corporation. Construction commenced in 1983 and the tower was completed in 1985.

The development was originally called the "Dallas Main Center", but has taken many names over its short history. Upon opening, the tower was called "InterFirst Bank Plaza" and has been renamed several times because of the mergers and acquisitions in the banking industry. In 1986, the tower was renamed "First Republic Bank Plaza" after InterFirst Corporation's merger with Republic Bank Corporation. First Republic Corporation later failed and was sold in 1988 to Charlotte-based North Carolina National Bank by the Resolution Trust Corporation becoming NCNB Texas. The tower was renamed "NCNB Plaza". In 1991, in order to reflect its growing national portfolio NCNB rebranded themselves and the tower took the name "NationsBank Plaza", and finally, the building was renamed "Bank of America Plaza" in 1998 after NationsBank acquired San Francisco-based Bank of America and taking their name and operating under their charter. In 2020, it was listed for sale. In 2026, it was valued at $126 million, and was 70 percent leased.

== Design ==
=== Architecture ===
Original plans for the development, initially called Dallas Main Center, called for two 72-story towers, a 600-room hotel, and a parking garage. Original designs for the tower were capped with stepped pyramid crowns and were initially intended to be clad in a silver glazing with gold accent band curtain wall. In order to gain FAA approval to build the tower, the stepped pyramid was removed. Another design change altered the curtain wall materials, which were replaced with blue glazing and grey marble accent bands.

As a result of the collapse of the price for oil, real estate, and banking industry in Texas in the mid-eighties, the twin tower and hotel were never completed. The hotel site remains a surface parking lot, and the site of the second 72-story tower was purchased by the City of Dallas after a 2006 bond election. The surface parking lot was converted into Belo Garden Park.

=== Lighting ===
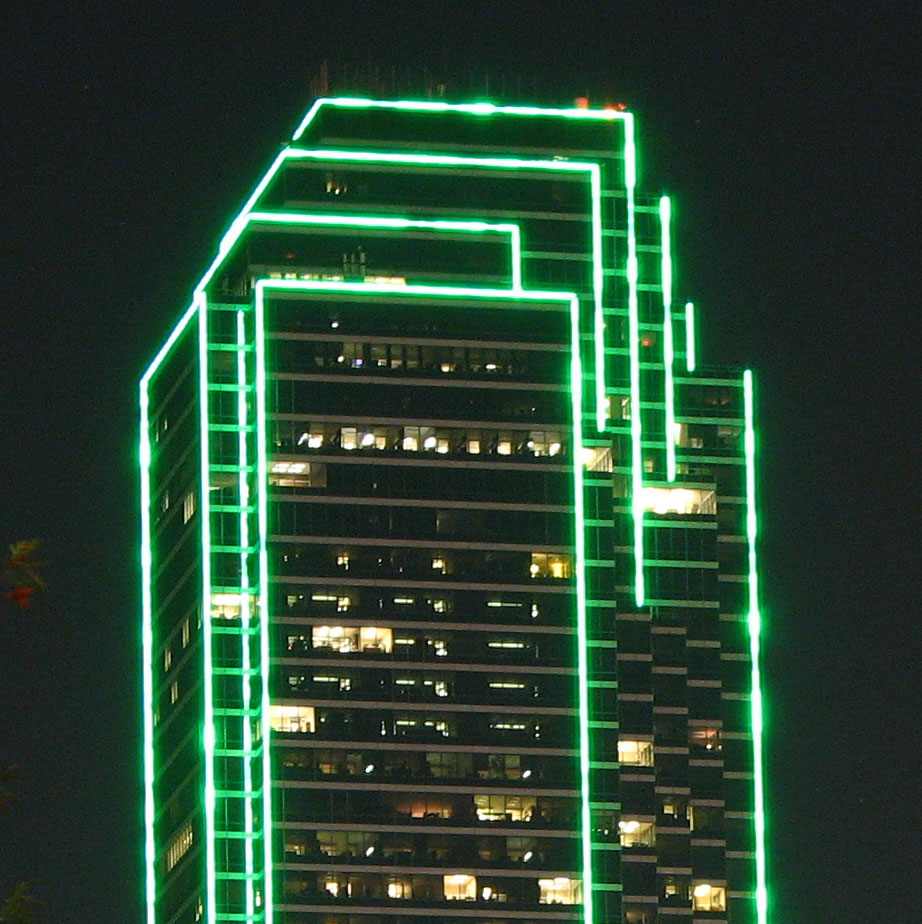
Lighting at night.

The building's facetted facade was first accented at night by nearly 2 miles (3 km) of green argon lighting running primarily at the edges and corners of the tower. The lighting design concept was by Theo Kondos Associates, lighting design firm in New York City, New York. Due to the green lighting, the building is often referred to as "The Pickle." Green was chosen over red or blue because it is more visible from a distance. It has also been reported that the second tower, if built would have been accented with purple lighting (often called “The Eggplant”).

Several months later, many of the argon tubes had burnt out due to a combination of several high voltage phenomena—one of which is referred to as the "corona effect" that discharges high voltage at the ends of the tube connections burning them out. After an intensive study, the developer shut down the entire lighting system and replaced it with a "mid-point grounded" system and larger, 18 mm tubes. Cold temperatures continued to plague the replacement system's performance.

In a renovation project that began in May 2013, the original green argon lighting was replaced with multi-colored LED tubes. The renovations were 90 percent complete by November 14, 2013, when the LED outline was showcased at the re-lighting ceremony. This was made possible by Innovative Lighting in Irving, and Turner Construction.

=== Art ===
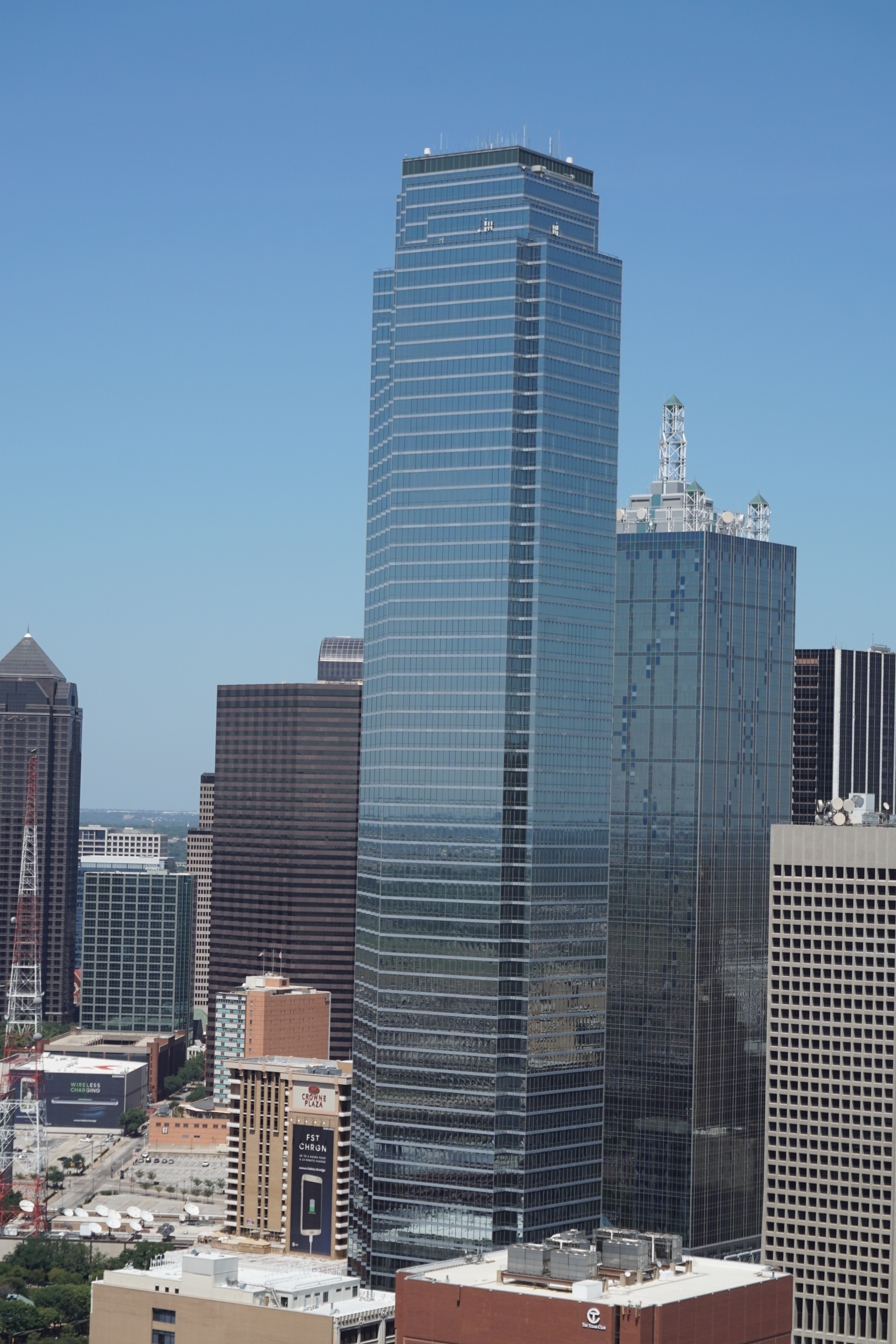
Bank of America Plaza as viewed from Reunion Tower in August 2015

Alexander Liberman's sculpture "Venture" (1985) was located in the front plaza of the building until April 2013. The 38-foot (12 m) tall sculpture is composed of twelve wide steel tubes of approximately 1” thickness cut into various lengths and stacked end-to-end and painted red. The current building owners removed the sculpture to make room for a valet parking entry to the building. The sculpture was donated to the City of Dallas. It was refurbished and installed near Garage C at Dallas Love Field Airport.

During the 2013 renovation of the building's lighting, the nearby OMNI Hotel's LED system was host to the 2nd edition of the Video Association of Dallas' EXPANDED CINEMA video exhibition. One work in the program, "Ar City" by Dallas-based artist Michael A. Morris, poetically addressed the transition from the argon lighting to the new LED system, drawing attention to the absence of the green light on the skyline by reproducing the color with the OMNI's lights and musing on the uses of liquid argon. Many artists have been exhibited inside OMNI hotel such as Mona Kasra.

=== Broadcast and communications center ===
The top two floors function as a broadcast communications tower using the building itself as a broadcast tower structure. ABC, CBS, NBC, FOX and The CW operate television transmission facilities on the 72nd floor and 74th level roof as well as most federal law enforcement agencies. All point-to-point microwave and fixed-service antennas are concealed within a specifically designed glass communications parapet on the top floor. The base of the 73rd floor parapet opens to the 72nd floor data and communications center below allowing for easy and safe access during installation and servicing of wireless devices. It also protects the hardware from weather. The building operates a sophisticated in-building distributed antenna system as well as a shared tenant data center. James Chiles designed this facility in 1985 one year prior to his rooftop antenna design of Renaissance Tower in 1986.

Amateur radio operators also install repeater systems on this building.

=== Floor directory ===
The 72nd-73rd floors contain mechanical space and telecommunications equipment for the broadcast antennas on the roof. Two rooftop balconies on the 72nd floor are closed to the public and store the building's window washing equipment.

The lower level contains retail such as shops and restaurants which connect to the Dallas Pedestrian Network.

== In popular culture ==
Exterior shots of the building were used as the home of JRE Industries in Season 11 of the 1980s television series Dallas.

== Gallery ==
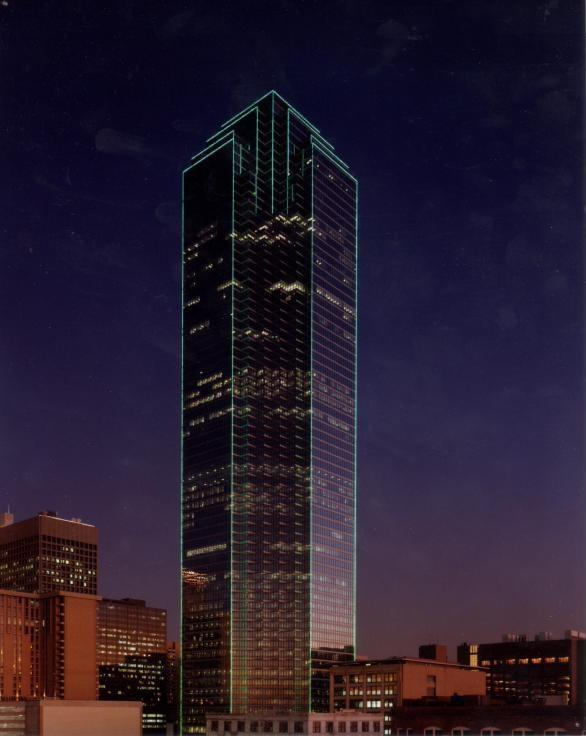
Bank of America Plaza at night

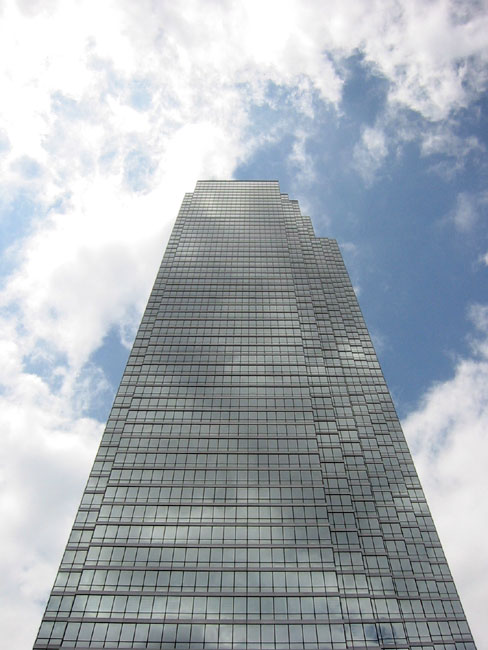
The Bank of America Plaza

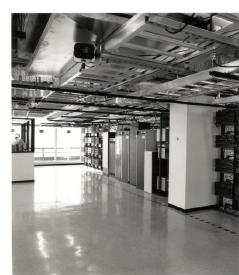
Data Center on 72nd floor

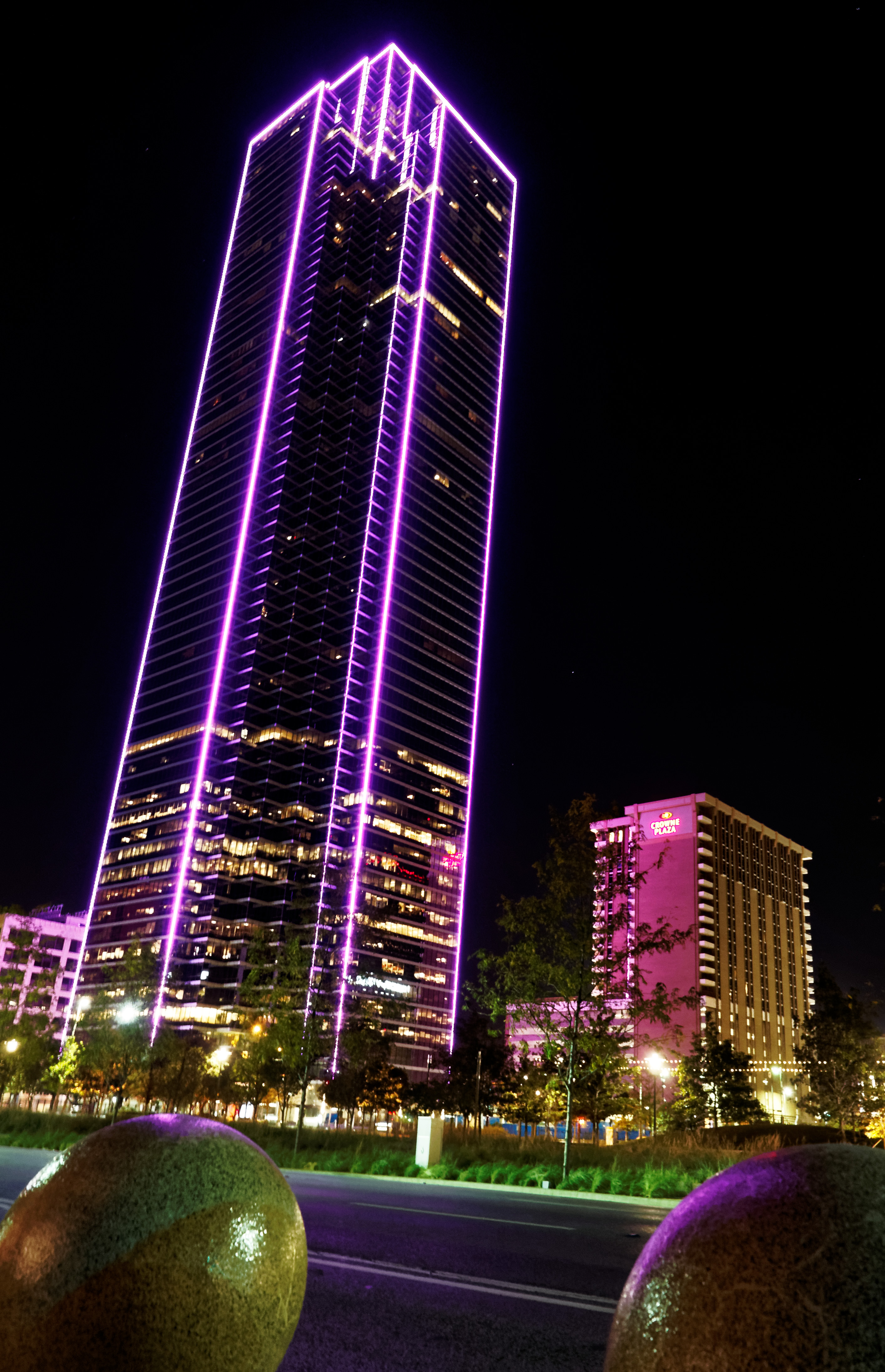
A view of the bank of the America Plaza in Dallas. It's lit up in purple, with sidewalk decorations in the foreground.

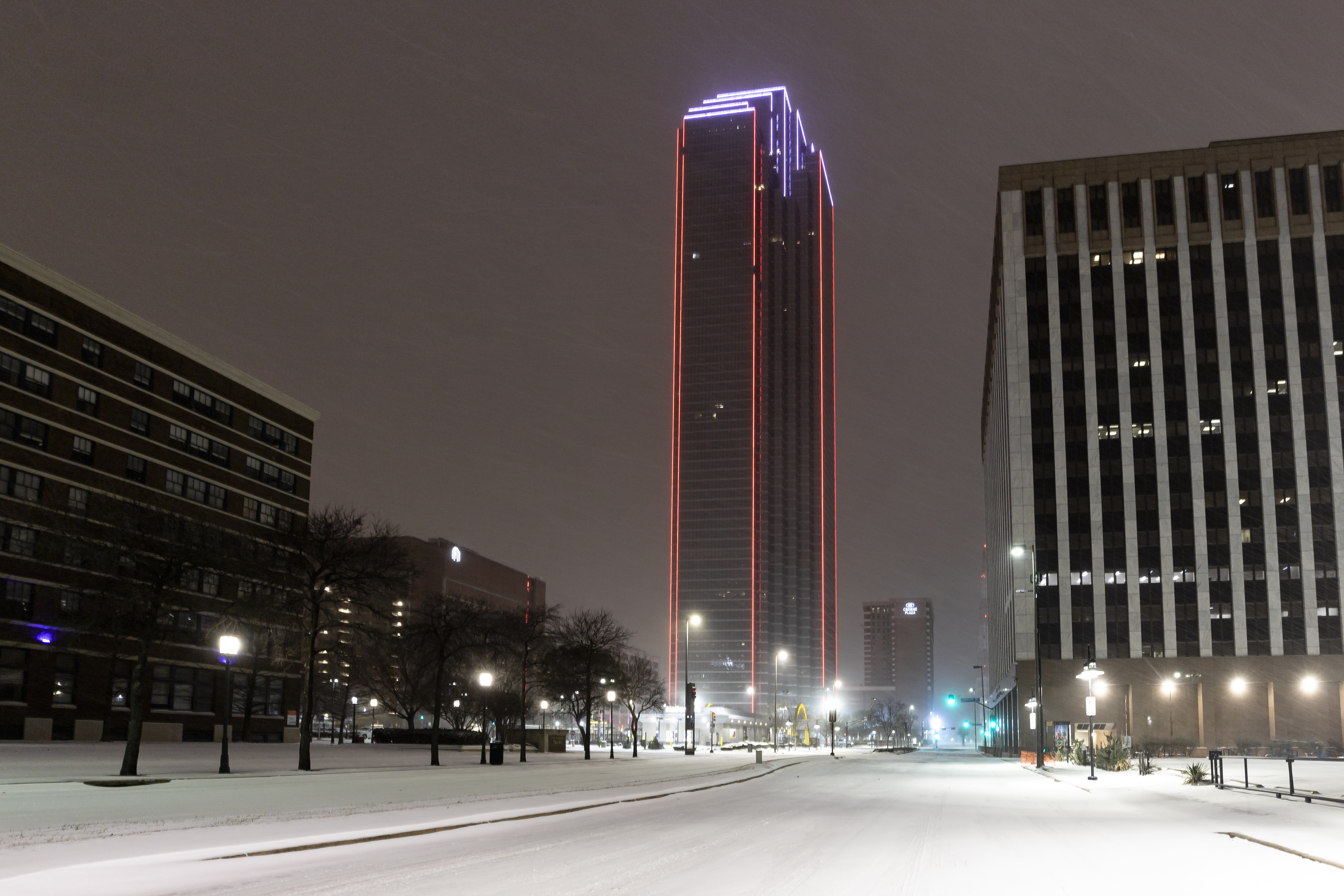
Bank of America Plaza in Dallas Snow 2021

== See also ==
- Tallest buildings in Dallas
- Tallest buildings in Texas
