= Doug's Gym =

Gym in Dallas, Texas, United States

Coordinates: 32.7809°N 96.7935°W

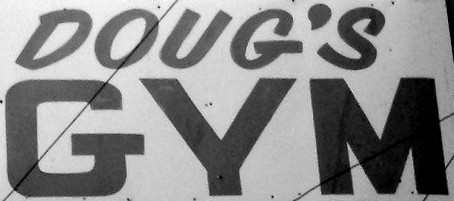
- Company type: Private
- Genre: Fitness
- Founded: 1962
- Founder: Douglas Eidd
- Headquarters: Dallas, Texas, U.S.
- Owner: Douglas Eidd
- Website: www.dougsgymdallas.com

Doug's Gym was founded in 1962 in Dallas, Texas, by Douglas Eidd, who had been operating the facility in the same downtown location for over fifty years. The gym was one of the landmarks of downtown Dallas. It had been recognized repeatedly as one of the best in the United States. After 55 years, the gym permanently closed in 2018.

== History ==
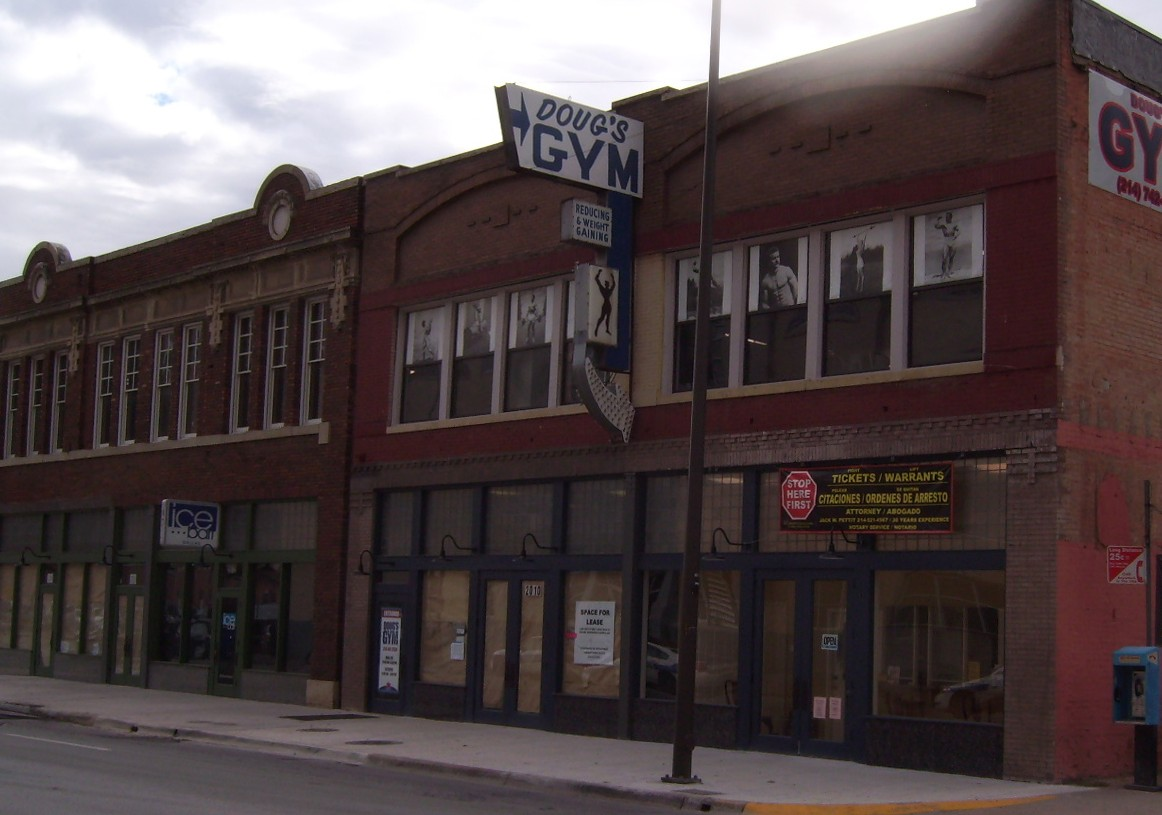
Doug's Gym seen from across the street.

Douglas Eidd (born November 4, 1930) founded Doug's Gym at 2010½ Commerce Street on September 1, 1962, after serving in the Korean War as a physiotherapist (1950–1953) and working in several Dallas gymnasiums. The gymnasium was located at the heart of the then bustling downtown area, right opposite the famous Dallas Statler Hilton hotel.

When John F. Kennedy was slain on November 22, 1963, Eidd witnessed the ensuing commotion at the police station across the street. Jack Ruby was a regular visitor to the gym. Triple H trained there before a Wrestlemania. In the 1970s and 1980s, the area around 2010½ Commerce Street became increasingly deserted, but more recently has experienced a revitalization, like many cities in the US. Thus, Doug's Gym now overlooks the new Main Street Garden Park.

== Awards ==
Muscle and Fitness magazine has twice recognized Doug's Gym as one of the best in the United States. In its July, 2005, issue it listed the gym as the “best old-school gym”; again in 2009, the gym made it into the magazine's list of the “top 6 bodybuilding gyms.” Muscle and Fitness described the gym as “an old-fashioned training facility in the best sense of the word.

== Equipment ==
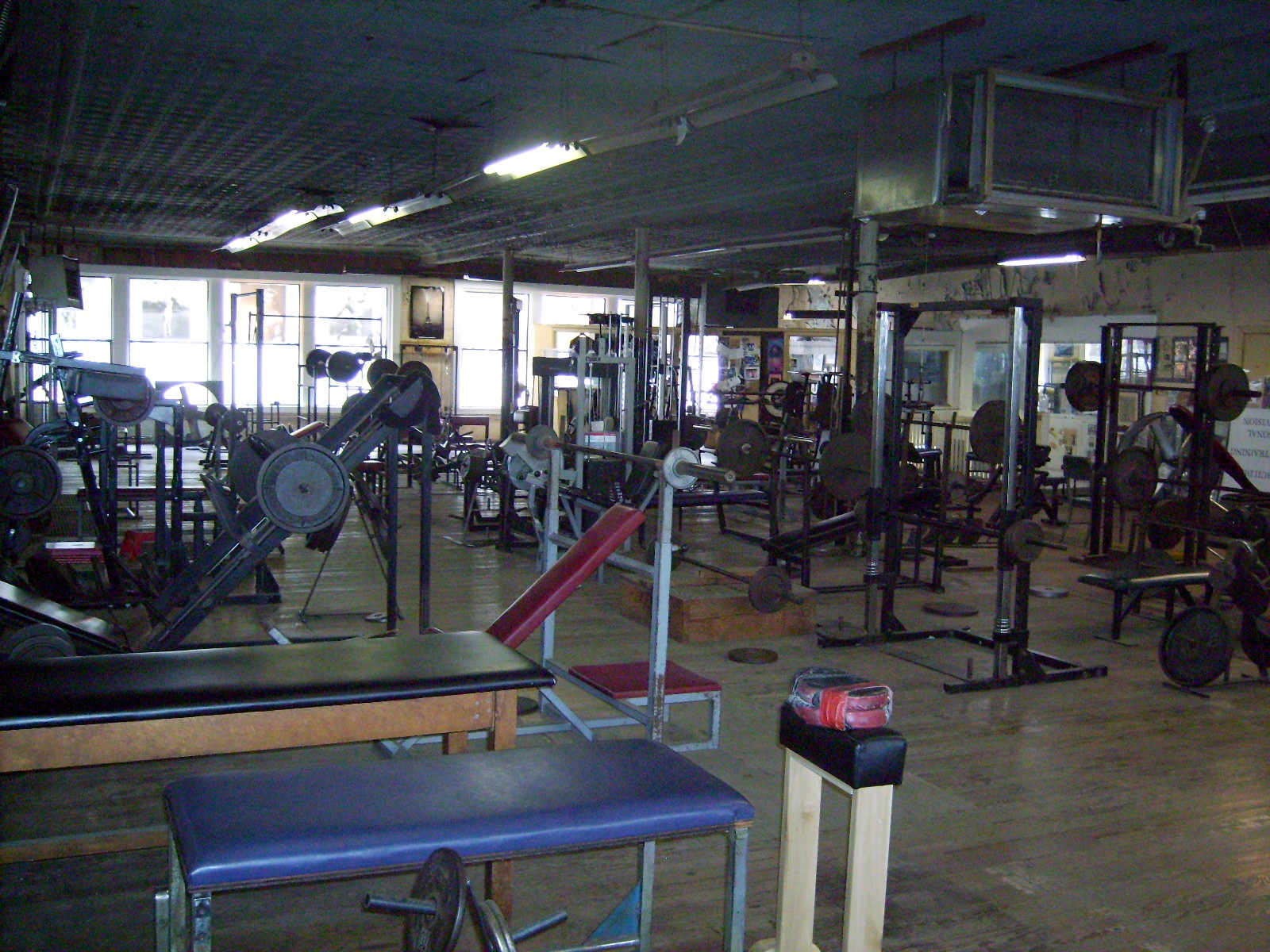
Inside Doug's Gym.

Doug's Gym still contains most of the original workout equipment from the 1960s. With the exception of a Smith machine, there are only free-weight workout stations. The absence of machines contributes to the “old-fashioned” feel that the gym exudes.

== Sources ==
Printed

- Jim Poyner, “Getting an Overhaul at Doug's—a Gym of a Body Shop,” Dallas Morning News (Jan. 6, 1979), Sports Spectrum, p. 1.
- “Throwback gym offers fitness—no frills,” Odessa American (Feb. 28, 2000), p. 3B.
- Philipp W. Rosemann, “Doug's Gym: a Gym with a Soul,” (University of Dallas) University News (March 4, 2008), p. 13.
- Roy Appleton, “Lifting Spirits since '62,” Dallas Morning News (July 20, 2008), pp. 1/23A.

Online

- William DeShazer, “Doug's Gym: in Dallas since 1962,” Dallas Morning News Video (July 16, 2008).
- Roy Appleton, “Ironman of Doug's Gym in Dallas still Going Strong,” Dallas Morning News Video (July 18, 2008).
- Greg Merritt, "Doug's Gym: The Oldest Old-School Gym," The Barbell (March 1, 2022).
