= Hilton Hotel (Dallas, Texas) =

- U.S. National Register of Historic Places
- U.S. Historic district – Contributing property
- Recorded Texas Historic Landmark
- Dallas Landmark
- Dallas Landmark Historic District; Contributing Property
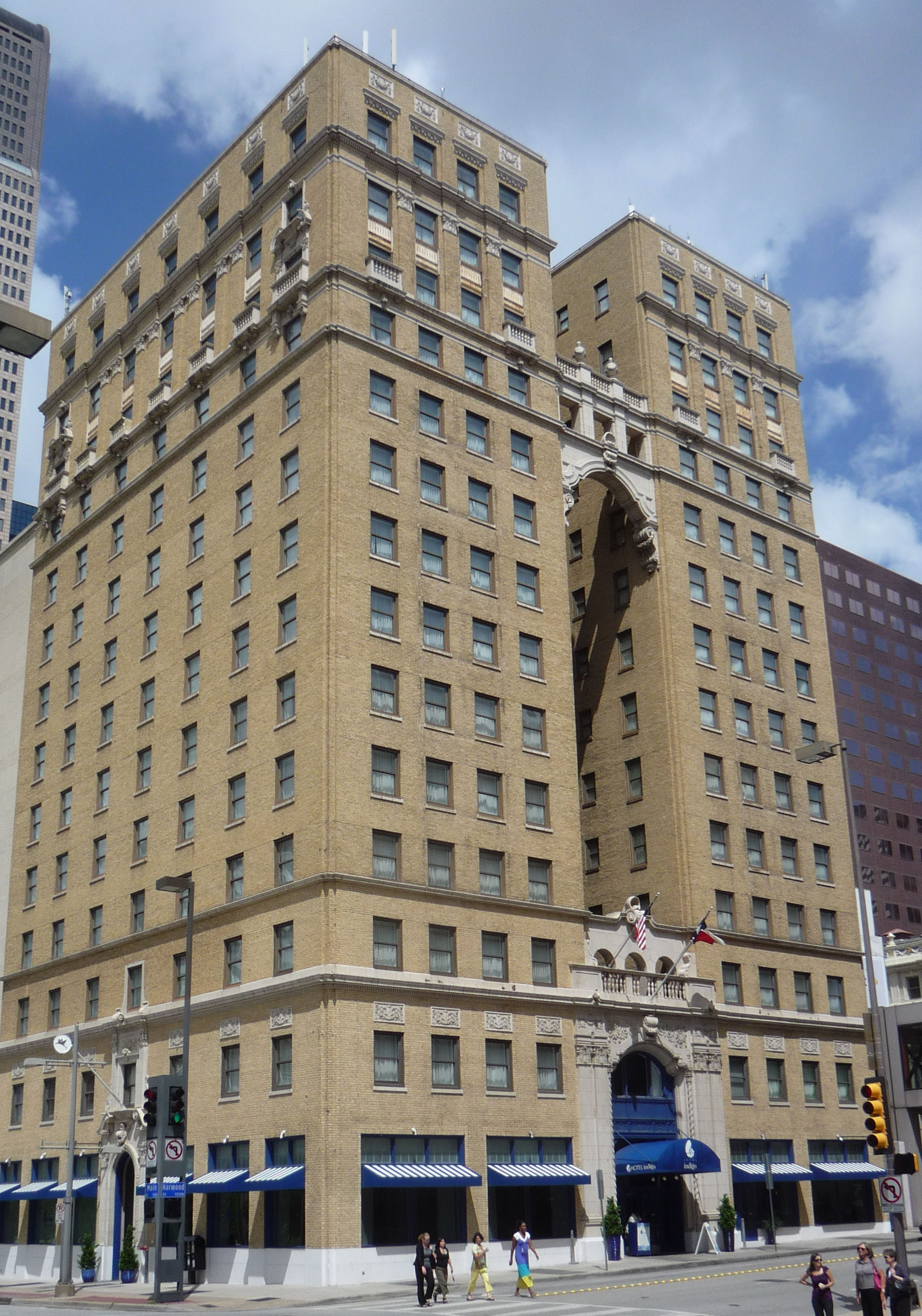
- Hilton building in 2010

- Location within Texas Location within the United States
- Interactive map showing the location of the Dallas Hilton
- Location: 1933 Main St., Dallas, Texas
- Coordinates: 32°46′54″N 96°47′39″W
- Area: less than one acre
- Built: 1925
- Built by: McKenzie Const.
- Architect: Lang and Witchell
- Architectural style: Beaux-Arts
- Part of: Dallas Downtown Historic District (ID04000894)
- NRHP reference No.: 85003092
- RTHL No.: 6739
- DLMK No.: H/28
- DLMKHD No.: H/48 (Harwood HD)

Significant dates
- Added to NRHP: December 5, 1985
- Designated CP: August 11, 2006
- Designated RTHL: 1988
- Designated DLMK: February 26, 1986
- Designated DLMKHD: February 28, 1990

The Hotel Indigo Dallas Downtown is a historic hotel opened in 1925 as the Hilton Hotel, located at the corner of Main Street and S. Harwood Street in downtown Dallas, Texas (United States). The hotel is a contributing property in the Harwood Street Historic District and Main Street District. It is also located across the street from Main Street Garden Park.

== History ==
=== Hilton Hotel ===
The Hilton Hotel, built by Conrad Hilton, was his first hotel to bear the "Hilton" name. Conrad Hilton operated one of the two earliest hotel chains in the state, and went on to become a world leading hotel operator, with an international chain of hotels and resorts.

Unlike his earlier hotels, which were bought and renovated but not built by Conrad Hilton himself, the new hotel in Dallas was designed by Hilton from the ground up to be a prominent high rise hotel.

For the building site Hilton chose the highest point in downtown Dallas. Hilton retained the prominent architectural firm of Lang and Witchell, one of the two most respected firms in Dallas, to design the new hotel. They designed the hotel as a 14-story, reinforced concrete and masonry structure in a simplified Sullivanesque style with symmetrical facades and Beaux Arts detailing. Its horseshoe plan is similar to that of the Magnolia Building and features two massive towers projecting toward Harwood Street which form an open court. The towers were tied together on the main (Harwood) facade with a frontispiece entrance and an elaborate bridge at the tenth level.

Ground was broken on July 25, 1924 and the building was completed just over one year later for a total cost of $1.36 million—Hilton's second most costly Texas highrise. The hotel officially opened on Thursday, August 6, 1925. Hilton maximized all available space in the public areas of the hotel for an assortment of vending services. The presence of the druggist, men's shop, barber shop, valet service, beauty shop, coffee shop, tailor, cigar/news stand, telegraph office, dining room and others dovetailed with Hilton's emphasis on service while the rents those services paid supplemented the finances of the operation. Not wanting to tie up capital in land ownership, Hilton introduced the idea of a 99-year land lease with the Dallas property. The concept was well known in the East in 1925, but it was new to Texas commerce circles.

Hilton's private offices were also located on the mezzanine level as were seven sample rooms with Murphy wall beds. The 325 guest rooms were typically small and were painted in colors of pearl gray and cream. The rooms and corridors were carpeted. Most had full baths, and the rest had half baths. Seventy-five percent of the rooms had south or east exposure for maximum ventilation; no rooms were located on the west.

The competition of the nearby Adolphus and Baker Hotels compelled Hilton to formulate a marketing strategy for attracting a new clientele — "The Average Man" — to whom a moderately priced, modern hotel of handsome design would appeal in a city where there were few alternatives.

=== White Plaza Hotel ===
During the Great Depression, Hilton lost four hotels and saved five, one of which was the Dallas location. In 1938, he relinquished the operating lease of the Hilton Hotel in Dallas, after his move to California. George Loudermilk, the owner, contracted with another well known hotel operator in Texas, A. C. "Jack" White, in July 1938 to run the hotel. White changed the name of the hotel to the White Plaza Hotel. He also undertook improvements totaling $150,000, including improvements to the air conditioning system. The 325 rooms were converted to 234, all with private baths. Loudermilk resided at the hotel until his death in 1953.

In 1961, the building was sold to Earlee Hotels, but the hotel continued to bear the name White Plaza until 1974. During these years the hotel began to deteriorate and decline in popularity.

=== Restoration ===
In 1977, Opal Sebastian, real estate investor, purchased the building and changed the name to the Plaza Hotel. All floors above the fourth level had been closed for an unknown period of time, and all rooms were in poor condition. Sebastian reopened the floors one at a time as they were rehabilitated.

On February 15, 1985, the hotel was sold again to the Dallas Plaza Partners of California, made up of Hotel Equity Management and Blackmond, Garlock and Flynn real estate merchant banker of San Francisco. The Dallas Plaza Partners contracted with Corgan to restore the hotel and Jerry O'Hara to renovate the interior, which took ten months. In December 1985, The Dallas Plaza Hotel opened its doors. It was later renamed The Aristocrat Hotel of Dallas and managed by Holiday Inn.

The building was added to the National Register of Historic Places and designated a Dallas Landmark in 1985. It was also designated as a Recorded Texas Historic Landmark in 1988.

=== 2005 Renovation ===
In 2005, SMI Hotel Group purchased the hotel. In conjunction InterContinental Hotel Group, the parent company of Holiday Inn, began the conversion to the Hotel Indigo Dallas Downtown. During this renovation property's interior underwent a $5 million renovation that introduced hardwood floors, spa-like guest bathrooms, a business center and an upgraded fitness area. Today the hotel contains 3,000 square feet (280 m^{2}) of meeting space and 169 rooms.

== See also ==
- National Register of Historic Places listings in Dallas County, Texas
- Recorded Texas Historic Landmarks in Dallas County
- List of Dallas Landmarks
