= Main Street Garden Park =

Park in Dallas, Texas, United States

Main Street Garden
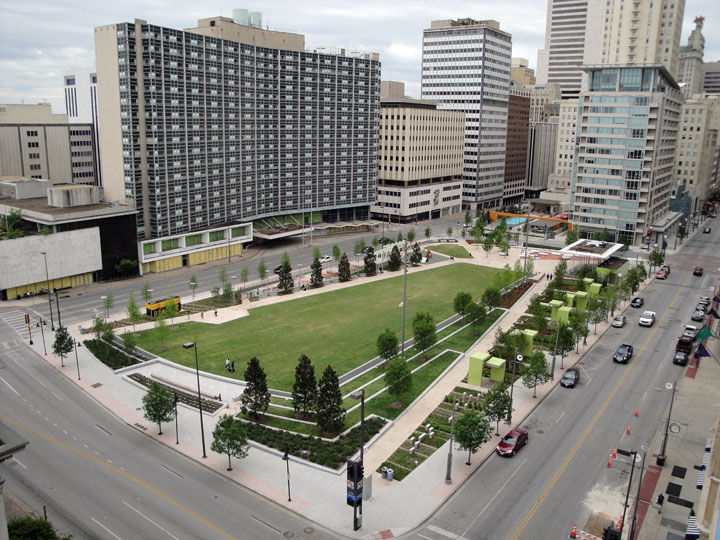
- Main Street Garden Park in 2010.
- Interactive map of Main Street Garden
- Type: public park
- Location: 1900 Main Street; Dallas, Texas
- Coordinates: 32°46′52″N 96°47′42″W
- Area: 1.75-acre (7,100 m^{2})
- Created: 2009
- Operator: City of Dallas
- Status: open all year
- Website: www.mainstreetgarden.org

Main Street Garden Park is a 1.75-acre (0.71 ha) public park located in downtown Dallas, Texas, United States The $17.4 million park was primarily funded through the City of Dallas’ 2003 and 2006 bond programs and is the first of several planned downtown core parks, including Pacific Plaza Park and Belo Garden Park. Main Street Garden replaced Pegasus Plaza as the site for major downtown events throughout the year.

== History ==
The downtown block, which previously consisted of early commercial structures and parking facilities, was cleared in 2007. Construction began in November 2008 and the park was dedicated November 11, 2009 with a public celebration on November 21, 2009.Main Street Garden Park was designed by Thomas Balsley Associates, a NYC-based Landscape Architecture firm.

== Location ==
Main Street Garden Park is surrounded by St. Paul, Main, Harwood and Commerce streets in the Main Street District. It is located within the Harwood Historic District, which includes surrounding structures such as the Dallas Hotel Indigo, Titche-Goettinger Building, Dallas Municipal Building and more. Other surrounding structures include the Mercantile National Bank Building, Dallas Statler Hilton and Old Dallas Central Library.

== Features ==
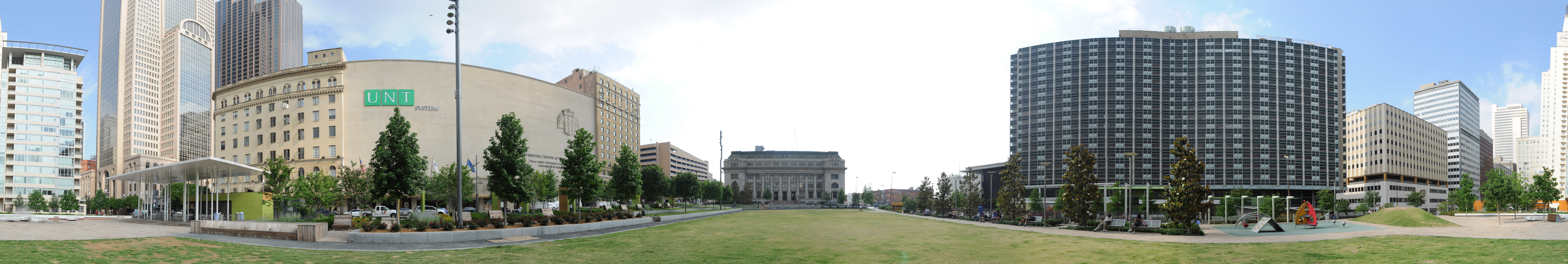
360° panoramic view of Main Street Garden Park

Amenities of the park include a café and shade structure, splash fountain, playground, urban dog run, garden rooms and concert green. The shade structures contain a public art commission, "SpectraScape" by artist Leni Schwendinger, containing bands of light that change throughout the year and at sunrise/sunset. The park also contains a large neon sign spelling out "P-A-R-K." This sign once hung on a parking garage at the site and was refurbished before re-installation. In the northeast corner of the park a flower garden contains salvaged architectural materials from former commercial structures once located on the site and an interpretive sign details the history of the area.
