= Kirby Building =

- Busch Building, Busch–Kirby Building
- U.S. National Register of Historic Places
- U.S. Historic district – Contributing property
- Recorded Texas Historic Landmark
- Dallas Landmark
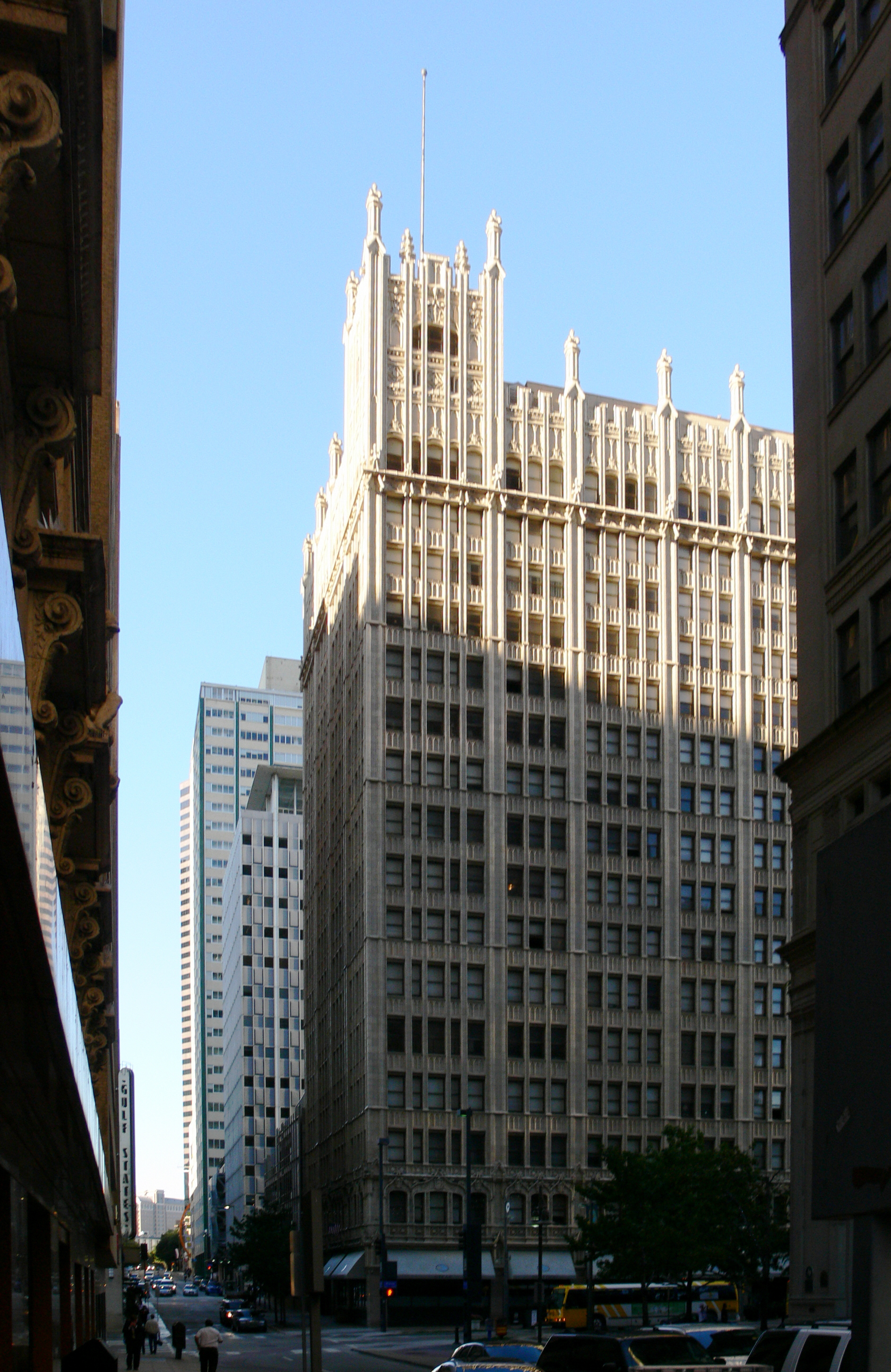
- Busch-Kirby Building in 2009

- Location within Texas Location within the United States
- Location: 1501-1509 Main Street; Dallas, Texas
- Coordinates: 32°46′51″N 96°47′58″W
- Area: less than one acre
- Built: 1912
- Architect: Barnett, Haynes & Barnett, Lang & Witchell
- Architectural style: Late Gothic Revival, Skyscraper, Art Deco
- Website: The Kirby
- Part of: Dallas Downtown Historic District (ID04000894)
- NRHP reference No.: 80004489 (original); 96001015 (increase)
- RTHL No.: 6608
- DLMK No.: H/37

Significant dates
- Added to NRHP: July 4, 1980
- Boundary increase: September 12, 1996
- Designated CP: August 11, 2006
- Designated RTHL: 1988
- Designated DLMK: September 30, 1987

The Kirby Building, historically known as the Busch Building, is a 17-story skyscraper in the Main Street District of Downtown Dallas. The structure was completed in 1913 by beer magnate Adolphus Busch to accompany his nearby Hotel Adolphus. The building became vacant with many older buildings during the economic downturn of the 1980s. While the building was symbolic of downtown's crash in the 1980s, it also served as a symbol of the start of the resurrection as it became the first high-rise to be converted from office use to residential apartments. The structure is a Dallas Landmark and listed on the National Register of Historic Places.

== See also ==
- National Register of Historic Places listings in Dallas County, Texas
- Recorded Texas Historic Landmarks in Dallas County
- List of Dallas Landmarks
