= Salazar Center =

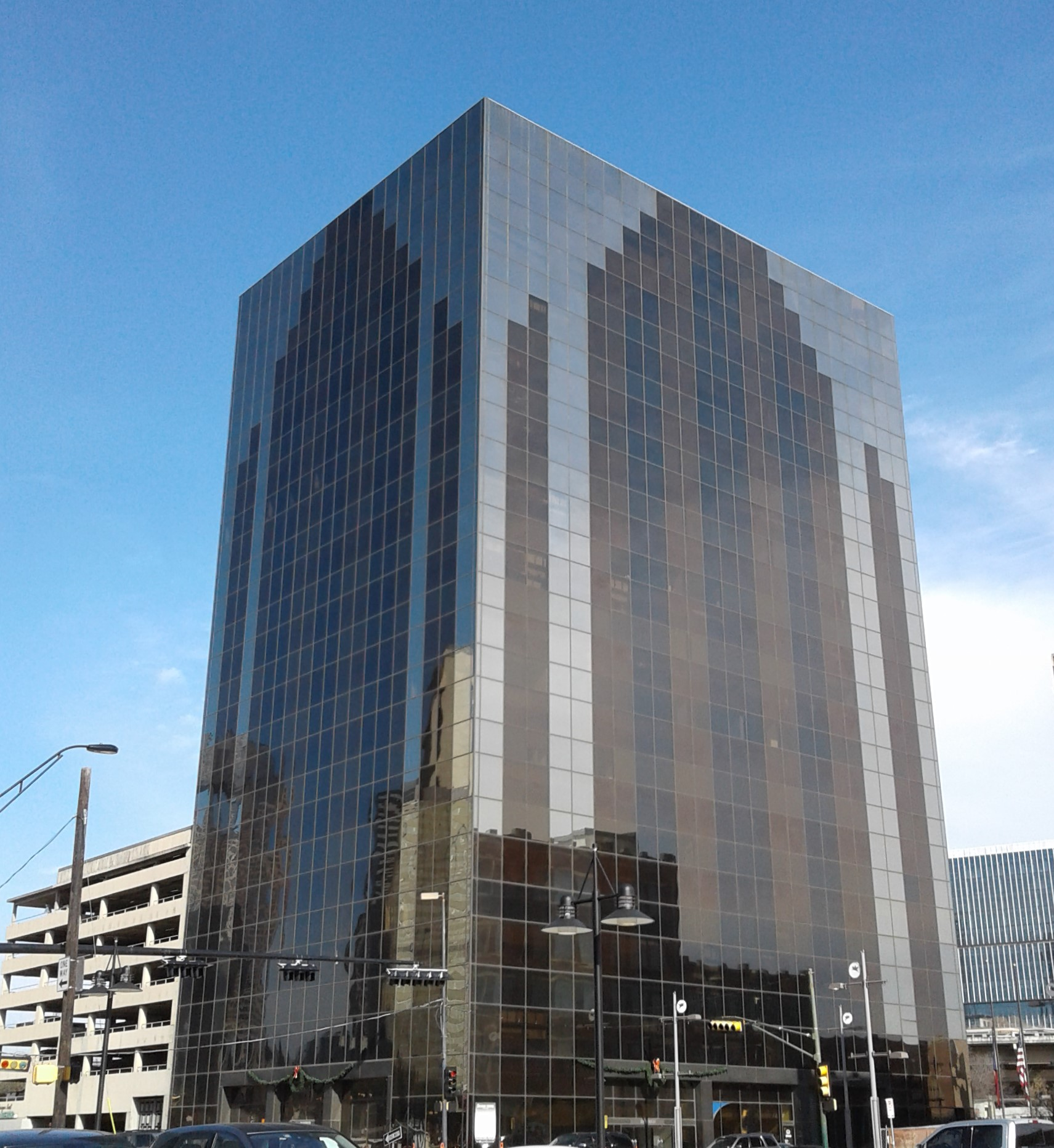
- The Salazar Center building in 2018

General information
- Status: Completed
- Type: Office
- Location: 2201 Main Street; Dallas, Texas (USA)
- Coordinates: 32°46′58″N 96°47′27″W
- Opening: June 1960

Technical details
- Floor count: 13
- Floor area: 156,344 sq ft (14,524.8 m^{2})
- Lifts/elevators: 5

Design and construction
- Developer: Glenn Justice

Salazar Center is a mid-rise Class B skyscraper located on the eastern edge of the Main Street District of downtown Dallas, Texas (USA).

== History ==
The 12 story office building, bounded by Main Street, Elm Street, and Cesar Chavez Boulevard, was announced in 1958 as the new home for Blue Cross Blue Shield of Texas. During construction in 1958 a stack of steel beams tumbled sixty feet to the basement level, killing one worker and injuring two others. Despite the setback, the building opened for business in June 1960 and featured a curtain wall and masonry exterior and attached 7 story parking garage. Blue Cross Blue Shield's 450 employees occupied the upper levels of the building, while lower levels were leased to other companies. The twelfth floor contained an employee cafeteria-auditorium.

The building's location gave it prominence on the eastern edge of the downtown business district as it was mostly surrounded by low-rise early commercial structures. The roof of the building contained a large 113-foot (34 m) by 8½ foot electronic message sign; during the 93 second message cycle 10 different advertising and community messages could be flashed (with an 8-second pause between messages). Due to the 1973 City of Dallas sign ordinance banning rooftop signs, the message sign went dark in 1973. The company applied for historic designation of the separate rotating Blue Cross sign, but after denial this sign was also removed.

In 1982 the building was renovated after the departure of Blue Cross Blue Shield to new offices in Richardson. The building's exterior was removed and refitted with bronze, silver and gray glass in a modern design.
