= Main Street District, Dallas =

Neighborhood in Dallas, Texas

Coordinates: 32.781°N 96.797°W

Main Street District
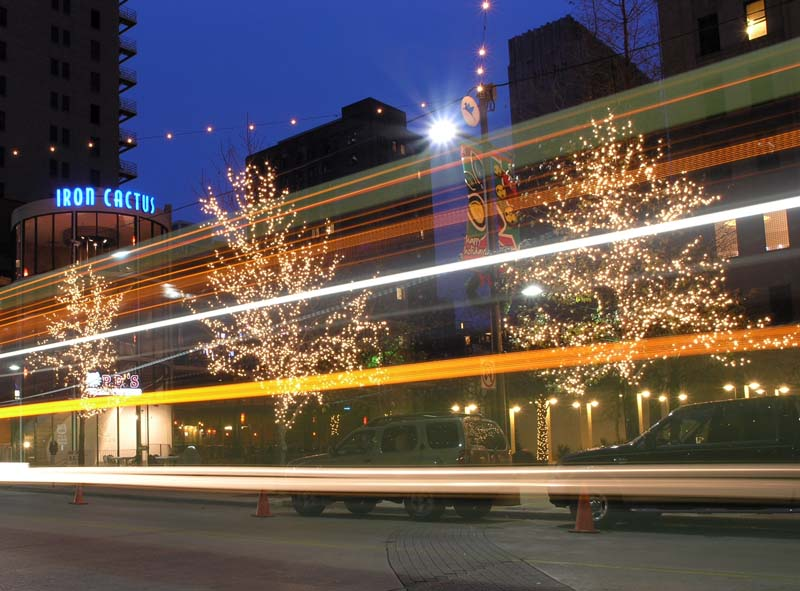
- A long exposure of Main Street, from east of Akard

- Location in Dallas
- Country: United States
- State: Texas
- Counties: Dallas
- City: Dallas
- Area: Downtown
- Elevation: 430 ft (130 m)
- ZIP code: 75201, 75202
- Area codes: 214, 469, 972
- Website: downtowndallas.org/ downtown_partner

The Main Street District of downtown Dallas, Texas, US, runs along Main Street and is bounded by Elm Street one block north, Commerce St. one block south, N. Lamar St. to the west, and US 75/I-45 (I-345) elevated highway to the east. The district is the spine of downtown Dallas, and connects many of the adjoining business and entertainment districts. The Main Street District excludes a small portion at the western end of the three parallel streets, which is where the John Fitzgerald Kennedy Memorial and Dealey Plaza are situated. That area falls within the neighboring West End Historic District.

== About ==
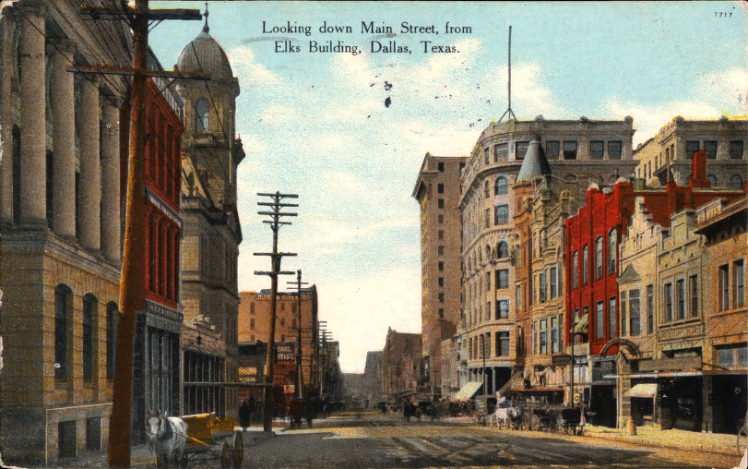
Looking down Main Street from Elks Building, Dallas, Texas (postcard, circa 1911)

Main Street has historically been the center of the city of Dallas. Many of Dallas' major retailers, hotels and banks once located here, and the district includes the city's early skyscrapers. Subsequent development of downtown moved north and east to the City Center District in following years, leaving many of the historic buildings inefficient for modern offices.

The Main Street District was the first district of downtown Dallas to experience extensive urban revival. Many of the grand historic buildings that had been neglected have been restored and adapted for new use. Pegasus Plaza, an urban plaza bounded by the Magnolia Hotel, Iron Cactus Restaurant, Adolphus Tower and the Kirby Building, is a gathering place for visitors and residents at the heart of the district. The narrow tree-lined street is a major pedestrian route through downtown. The district contains many sidewalk restaurants, basement night clubs and retail stores (most notably Neiman Marcus). While several of the buildings have found new life, there are many still awaiting restoration. Main Street Garden Park is a new focal park of the district's east end.

Commerce and Elm Streets, major east-west thoroughfares, form the boundaries of the district and also contain many additional landmark structures.

== Completed projects ==
- Titche-Goettinger Building, the former Titche-Goettinger Department Store, featuring 129 apartments (1997) and the Universities Center at Dallas.
- The Wilson Building, 135 apartments (1999).
- Main Street lofts, 8 apartments (1999).
- The Kirby Building, 156 apartments (1999).
- Magnolia Hotel, 300 room hotel (1999).
- The Davis Building, 183 apartments (2003).
- Dallas Power and Light Complex, 158 apartments 2004.
- Mercantile Bank Building + Renovation into 225 rental units with a new 15 story 150 rental units.
- Dallas National Bank Building into the Joule Hotel.
- The Metropolitan, 283 condo units.
- Third Rail Lofts
  - Gulf States Building – 68 apartments.
  - 1407 Main – 84 apartments.
  - 1414 Elm – 14 apartments.
- Pegasus Plaza
- Main Street Garden Park
- 100 North Central Expressway
- UNT Dallas College of Law
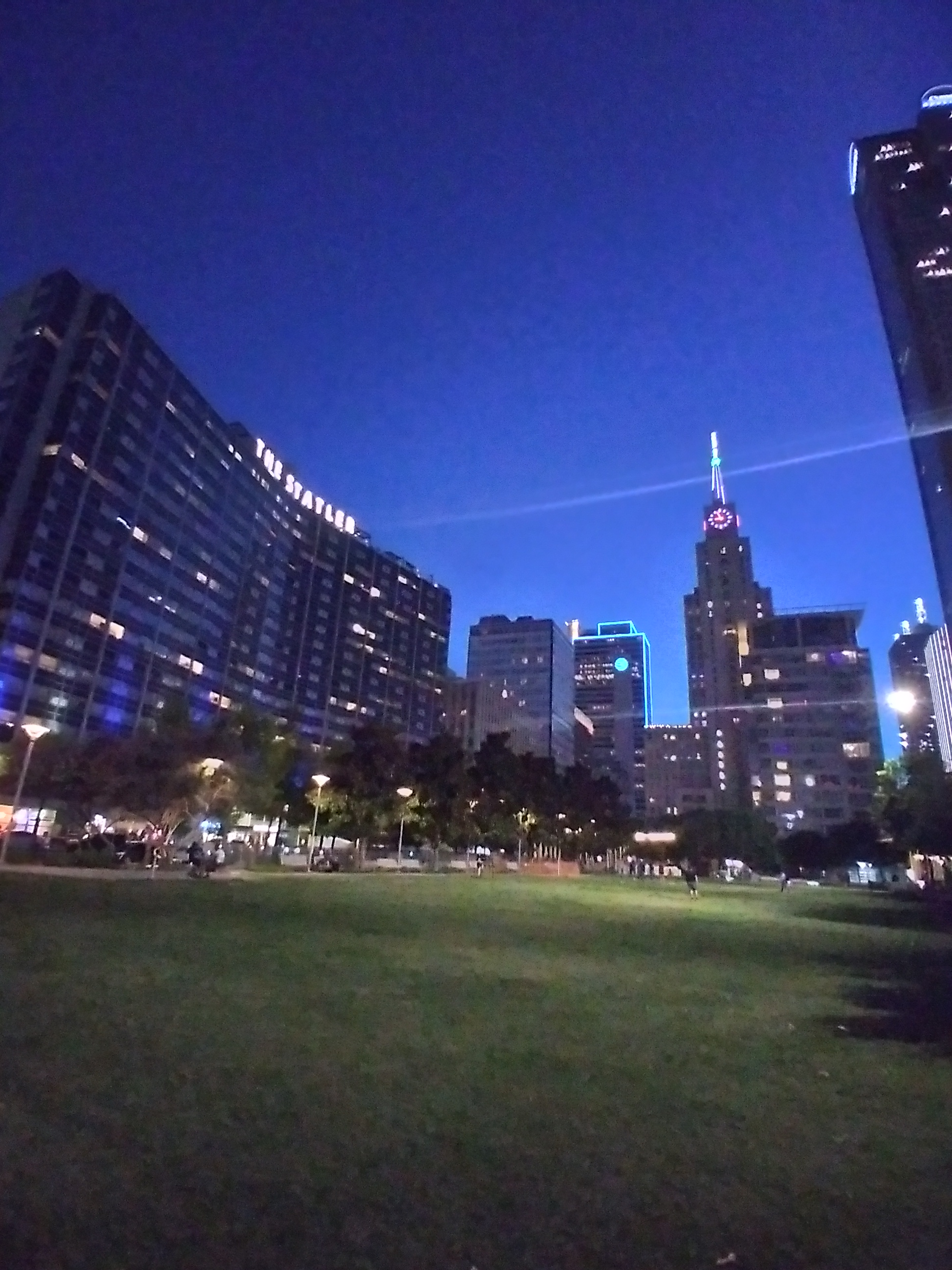
- The Statler and the Mercantile at night.
  Belo Garden Park

== Current and future projects ==
- The Statler Hotel & Residences - 159 hotel rooms, 219 apartments

== Landmark Structures of the Main Street District ==
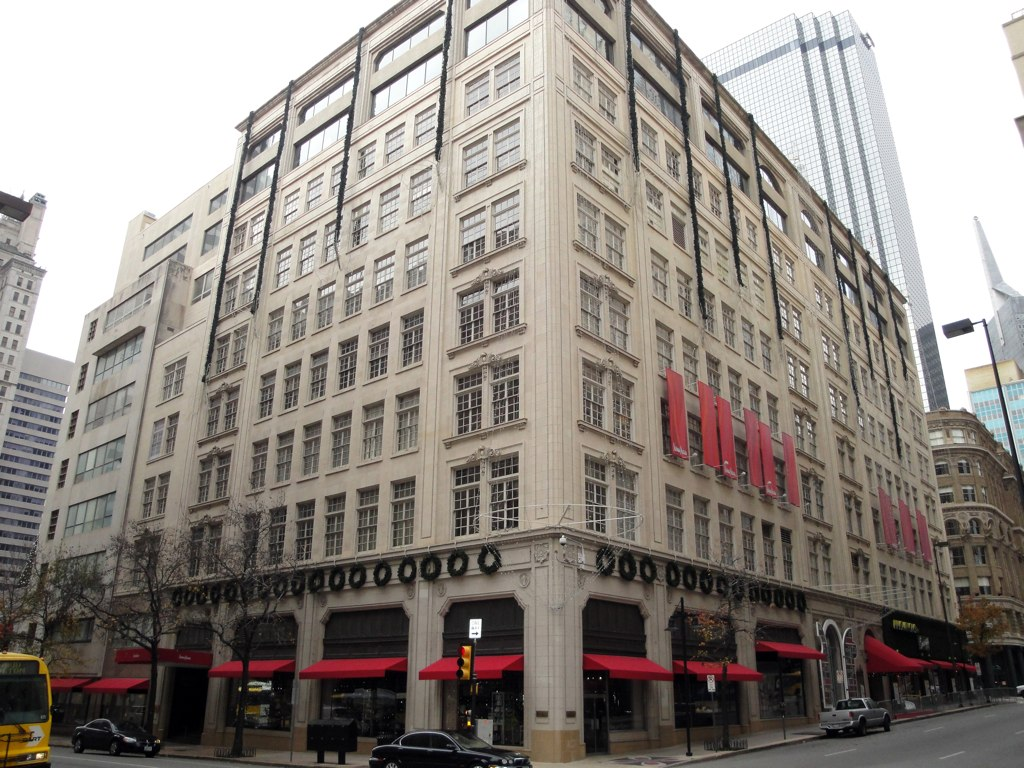
The flagship Neiman Marcus at Main and Ervay

Address	Building
801	El Centro College
901	Bank of America Plaza
1200	The Metropolitan
1201	One Main Place
1309	Davis Building
1407	1407 Main
1412	Center City Plaza
1415 Elm	Chase Bank Building
1415 Main	Gulf States Building
1509 Main	Kirby Building
1530 Main	Dallas National Bank Building
1607 Main	Praetorian Building
1623 Main	Wilson Building
1700 Main	Mercantile National Bank Building
1717 Main	Comerica Bank Tower
1900 Elm	Titche-Goettinger Building
1933 Main	Dallas Hotel Indigo
106 S Harwood	Dallas Municipal Building
1810 Commerce	Mercantile Continental Building
1618 Main	Neiman Marcus Building

== Education ==
The district is zoned to schools in the Dallas Independent School District.

Residents of the district west of Central are zoned to City Park Elementary School, Billy Earl Dade Middle School, and Madison High School. Residents east of Central are zoned to Ignacio Zaragoza Elementary School, Alex W. Spence Middle School, and North Dallas High School.

In the fall of 2014, the University of North Texas System opened the UNT College of Law in the Titche-Goettinger Building at 1900 Elm St. / 1901 Main St. After the completion of a $70 million dollar renovation in 2019, the law school moved to the former Dallas city hall on South Harwood Street next to Main Street Garden Park. the Beaux Arts style structure opened in 1914 and once held Lee Harvey Oswald but had slowly deteriorated over the decades. As of 2020, the UNT College of Law is the only public law school in the City of Dallas.

== Transportation ==
=== Streetcars ===
- MATA: M-Line Trolley (in City Center District)

The M-Line Trolley is a heritage streetcar that provides service between Cityplace/Uptown station in Uptown and St Paul station in Downtown. Service is free.
The M-Line features 40 dedicated stops serving key destinations including: the West Village, McKinney Avenue, Klyde Warren Park, the Dallas Arts District, four historical cemeteries, and the State Thomas historic neighborhood.

=== Trains ===
- DART Blue Line, Red Line, Green Line, Orange Line listed south to north
  - Akard Station (in City Center District)
  - St. Paul Station (in City Center District)
  - Pearl/Arts District Station (in City Center District)
