= Pegasus Plaza =

Park in Dallas, Texas, United States

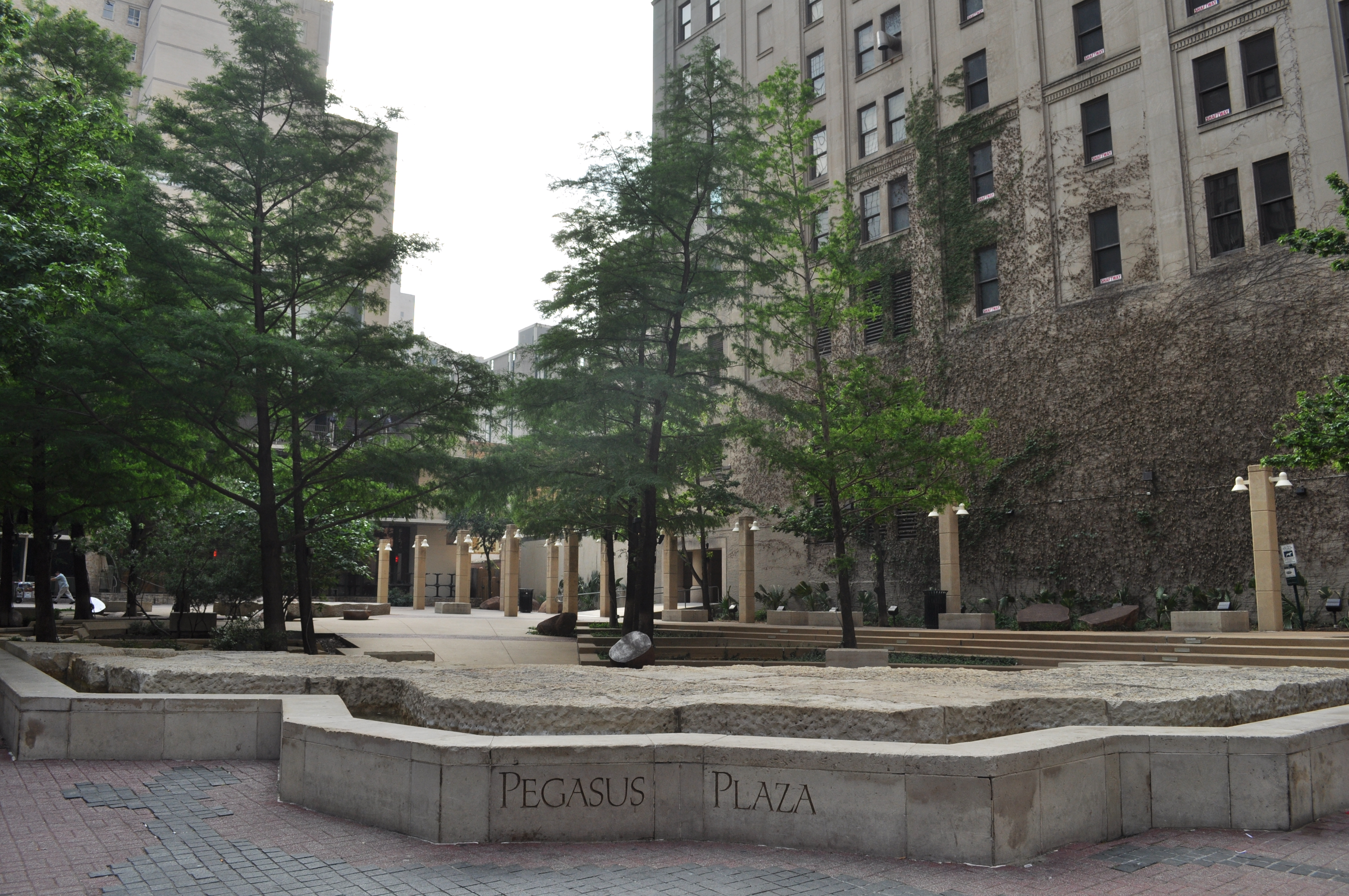
- Interactive map of Pegasus Plaza
- Type: public plaza
- Location: Dallas, Texas
- Coordinates: 32°46′50″N 96°47′57″W
- Area: 16,000 ft^{2} (1,500 m^{2})
- Created: 1994
- Operator: City of Dallas
- Status: open all year

Pegasus Plaza is a public park located in downtown Dallas, Texas. Located at the corner of Akard and Main Street in the Main Street District, the plaza takes its name from Pegasus, the iconic sign atop the adjacent Magnolia Hotel and the mythical flying horse. The shaded plaza includes several fountains and is used for concerts, festivals and Christmas celebrations.

== History ==
Pegasus Plaza was created as the centerpiece of a $7 million restoration program for the historic Main Street District. The project reconstructed Main Street and included new lighting, landscaping and street furniture in hopes of spurring redevelopment of many Dallas historic structures. The $2.5 million plaza, an idea of the Dallas Institute of Humanities and Culture, was paid for with $750,000 of 1982 bond election money and private donations, including $500,000 from actress Greer Garson.

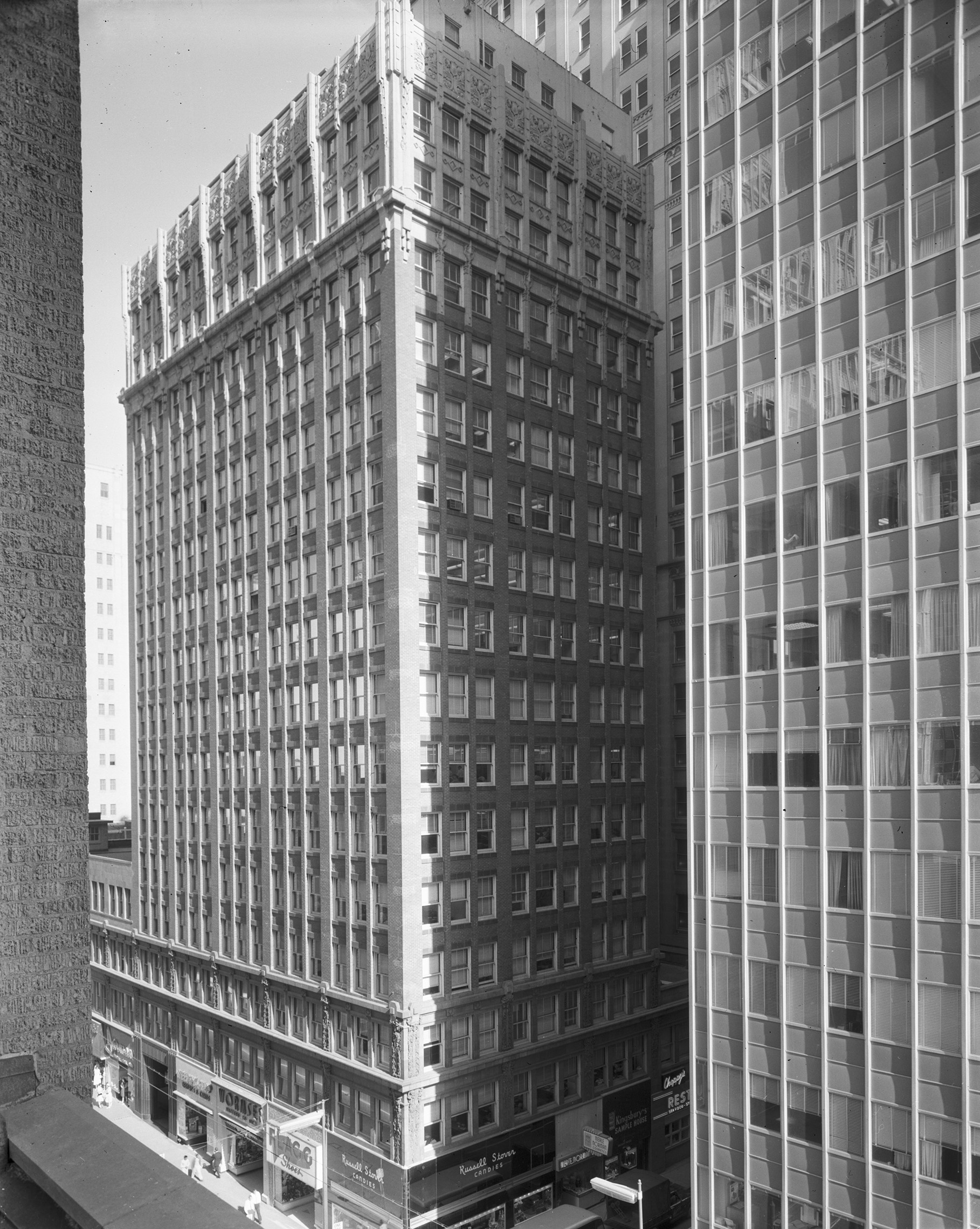
Southwestern Life Building (Otto H. Lang, architect)

Constructed on a corner parking lot originally the site of the Southwestern Life Insurance Building (Otto H. Lang, architect; built 1912; demolished 1972), work on the 16,000-square-foot (1,500 m^{2}) plaza began in 1993 and the plaza was opened in September 1994 by Dallas Mayor Steve Bartlett and former Mayor Annette Strauss .

The plaza has been the site of many city celebrations since its opening, including the city's millennium celebration in 2000 which included fireworks and relighting of the restored Pegasus atop the Magnolia Building.

== Design ==
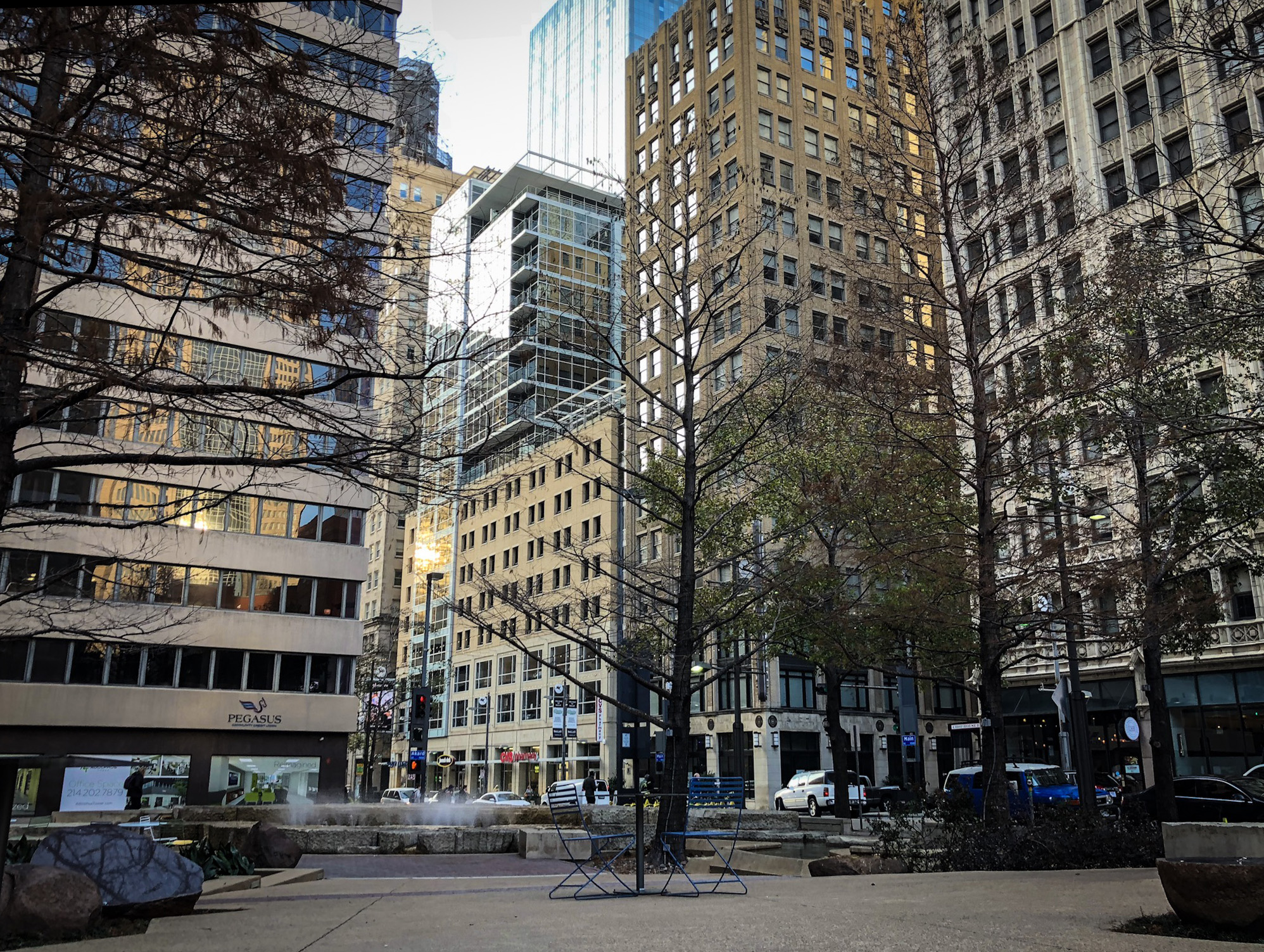
Pegasus Plaza, looking northwest

The overall Main Street redevelopment project was created by a consortium of architects and engineers led by Good Fulton & Farrell Architects, the Slaney/Santana Group and Cardenas-Salcedo and Associates. Artist Brad Goldberg was responsible for the design of the Pegasus Plaza itself. Although the plaza sits in the shadow of the 50-year-old namesake neon sculpture atop the Magnolia Building, the idea for the plaza and its crowning jewel heavily references Greek mythology.

The design retells the story of when the warrior Perseus slew the serpent-haired monster Medusa and Pegasus sprang from her severed head. He stamped the earth with his hoof, creating the Fountain of the Muses.

A limestone fountain and winding stream anchor the design of the plaza. The fountain is connected to a natural mineral spring 1,600 feet (490 m) below the Magnolia Building and is the source well for water in the plaza. A series of concentric circles embedded in the pavement radiates from the fountain into the surrounding streets.

Scattered throughout the plaza are nine granite boulders taken from Marble Falls carved and dedicated to the nine Muses. A stone dedicated to Terpsichore, the Muse of dance, is next to a performance area. A stone dedicated to Melpomene, the singer of elegies and tragedies, is next to a grove of willows, which are a symbol of death. A 4,000-pound quartz crystal, a grove of bald cypresses and other symbols of healing also fill the plaza.
