= The Statler Hotel & Residences =

Historic hotel in Dallas, Texas, U.S.

Coordinates: 32.7806°N 96.7949°W

The Statler

General information
- Location: Dallas, Texas, U.S., 1914 Commerce Street
- Opening: 1956, 2017
- Cost: $16 million
- Owner: Centurion American Development Group
- Operator: Hilton Hotels

Technical details
- Floor count: 19

Design and construction
- Architect: William B. Tabler
- Main contractor: Robert E. McKee General Contractor, Inc.

Other information
- Number of rooms: 159 hotel rooms, 219 apartments

Website
- Official website

The Statler Hotel & Residences is a hotel of mid-twentieth century design located at 1914 Commerce Street in downtown Dallas, Texas, United States. It is located on the edge of the Farmers Market District and adjacent to Main Street Garden Park. The hotel opened in 1956 as The Statler Hilton and was praised as the first modern American hotel and was designed by William B. Tabler. Later renamed the Dallas Grand Hotel, it closed in 2001, then was restored and reopened in 2017. It is currently a member of Historic Hotels of America, the official program of the National Trust for Historic Preservation.

== History ==
=== Early years ===
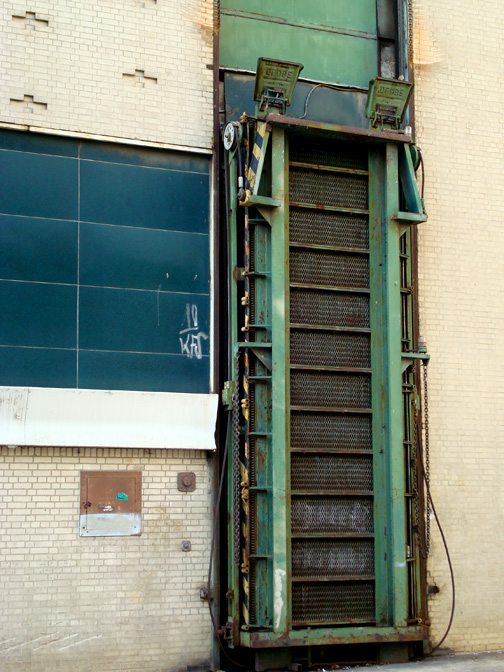
A unique folding lift at the back of the building used for raising cars into the ballroom.

Designed for the Statler Hotels chain, the hotel opened after that chain's sale to Hilton Hotels and was completed in 1956 at a cost of $16 million as The Statler Hilton. It was the first major hotel built in Dallas in nearly three decades. Opening day included luminaries from both coasts converging on Dallas for a four-day celebration.

Architect William B. Tabler introduced several new construction techniques and materials. The first full application of its kind, a cantilevered reinforced flat-slab system reduced the number of columns needed and created a soaring building. Tabler was also one of the first in the country to use a thin-skinned curtain wall design consisting of 1 3/8" panels made of glass and colored porcelain coated metal. Its innovative features made it a significant contributor to the Modern movement in Dallas, and to the state of Texas.

The Y-shaped building contained 1,001 guest rooms over 20 floors and a ballroom capable of hosting 2,200 people. The room count was reduced to 710 after numerous renovations.

The hotel itself was proclaimed “the last word in hostelries.” The Statler Hilton boasted many firsts for the hotel industry such as elevator music and custom 21" Westinghouse TVs in every room. It was one of the first hotels to have its ballroom and conference rooms located on lower floors, and a heliport was located on the roof to shuttle guests from nearby airports.

The outdoor patio located above street level along St. Paul Street contained a large rotating sculpture by José de Rivera. "A Wishing Star," 12 feet high and 15 feet across, was made of triangulated arms whose undersides were stainless steel and top goldplated.

The Statler played an important role in establishing Dallas as a business center for the Southwest. It was the largest hotel in the Southwest, and helped attract convention business to Dallas for many years. According to Dallas’ AIA Guide to Dallas, the Statler and next door's former Dallas Public Library, designed by George Dahl in 1953, make-up the “best block of 1950s architecture in the city.”

In 1988, Hilton Hotels sold the property, by that point known as the Dallas Hilton, to Hong Kong investors who renamed it the Dallas Grand Hotel. It closed in 2001.

=== Years of neglect ===
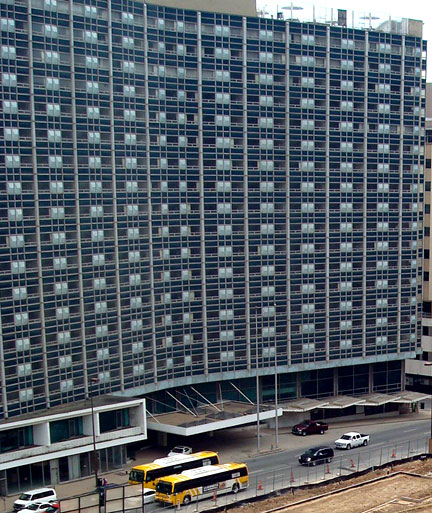
Dallas Statler Hilton with Main Street Garden Park construction in 2009

Over the years interior renovations have erased many of the original design elements, although staircases are still in their original configuration. The exterior has essentially remained unchanged over the years.

The building's rehabilitation has been hampered by a number of structural problems, notably water damage and vandalism on some of the floors. However, many of the floors and hotel rooms have remained untouched since 2001. Ironically, the flat-slab structural system that was so innovative in the 1950s now limits ceiling height to 9 feet and adds challenges to any renovation. The building also contains a large amount of asbestos.

The lack of adequate parking was once considered a challenge to redevelopment, although there are several nearby large parking garages. Main Street Garden Park might have included underground parking had there been a private developer interested before construction began in 2008.

Recent residential conversions and redevelopment initiatives by the City of Dallas have helped rejuvenate many of the nearby vacant structures. Main Street Garden Park, located in front of the Statler Hilton, has replaced many parking structures and is a gathering place for residents, office workers and students at the nearby Universities Center at Dallas.

Preservation Dallas included the structure in both its 2007 and 2008 Most Endangered lists and has campaigned for the preservation of the landmark hotel. In 2008 the National Trust for Historic Preservation included the Statler Hilton on its 2008 list of "America's Most Endangered Places," citing its importance in American mid-century design.

In June 2009 AIA Dallas announced a competition for a temporary installation to provide pleasing views to Main Street Garden Park patrons while the building remains empty. In late 2009 the building's lower levels were covered in opaque plastic and lit from behind, giving the building a lantern-like appearance.

On March 1, 2011, it was reported that the Statler Hilton building and the adjoining library had been sold to a developer, Leobardo Trevino, who intended to restore it. "Right now," he said, "the plans are to clean it up and restore the exterior and make it nice. We'll gut it and take it down to the concrete...But our plans are to restore it to the original and make it look like it did in 1956. We love the property." Trevino's group is also restoring 1600 Pacific Tower in downtown Dallas. In March 2012, it was revealed that a previously forgotten, 40-foot-long mural from 1956 had been discovered during the renovation of the building.

Towards the end of April 2013, Dallas news outlets were circulating reports that Trevino's Ricchi Dallas Investments was exploring deals to sell the hotel to prospective buyers; while Trevino did not specifically identify any individual prospects, Dallas-based developer Jack Matthews announced that his company, Matthews Southwest, was executing due diligence concerning a possible purchase, further stating that if Matthews Southwest were to go through with a purchase, that plans for residential redevelopment would be retained. The Matthews Southwest deal fell through in July 2013 after Matthews announced that they "couldn't make the financials work."

=== Restoration ===
Developer Mehrdad Moayedi's Centurion American Development Group signed a nonrefundable agreement to purchase the vacant 19-story building on Commerce Street in September 2013 with a goal of closing the purchase by April 2014. Beyond continuing plans for residential redevelopment, Moayedi is also considering other uses including a movie theater, grocery store, restaurants and retail space as well as a possible live music venue.

On May 1, 2015, it was announced that the building, and the adjacent Old Dallas Central Library, would be redeveloped as the Statler Hotel & Residences. The work cost $230 million. The hotel is again managed by Hilton Hotels, under their Curio Collection banner. The new hotel has 159 guest rooms on the first five floors, and 219 apartments on the upper 11 floors. The hotel features meeting facilities, as well as retail and office space, four restaurants and a lounge. A music venue is planned for the hotel's 14,500-square-foot ballroom. The hotel reopened on October 17, 2017.

== In the media ==
On July 1, 1976, Tina Turner left her husband Ike Turner before a scheduled Ike & Tina Turner gig at the Statler Hilton. While en route to the hotel, the Turners got into a physical altercation in the car. Shortly after their arrival, as Ike took a nap, Tina fled running on Saint Paul St across Interstate 30 to the nearby Ramada Inn. The Ramada Inn is now called the Hotel Lorenzo.
