= Mona Kasra =

American media artist and scholar

Mona Kasra is a media artist, projection designer, and interdisciplinary scholar. She is associate professor of Digital Media Design at the University of Virginia.

== Personal life ==
An Iranian-American, Kasra was born and raised in Tehran.

She holds a PhD in Arts and Technology from the University of Texas at Dallas, as well as an MFA in Video/Digital art and a BA in Graphic Design.

== Awards ==
- 2024 Helen Hayes Award Nomination - Outstanding Media/Projections Design, Unseen (Mosaic Theater Company of DC)
- 2023 Helen Hayes Award Nomination - Outstanding Media/Projections Design, The Till Trilogy: Benevolence ( Mosaic Theater Company of DC)

== Research and professional activities ==
Kasra's research involves exploring the confluence of media technologies, art, and culture; reflecting on the impact of emerging media on personal, political, and creative expression; and experimenting with affordances of such media for artistic practices of performance and installation.

Kasra's artwork has been exhibited in galleries and film festivals across the US and worldwide, and she has juried, curated, and programmed for many exhibitions, film festivals, and conferences. She regularly presents at national and international conferences and her publications can be found in several journals including New Media & Society, The Communication Review, and Media and Communication.

Kasra served as Conference Chair for ACM SIGGRAPH in 2016, and Art Gallery Chair for ACM SIGGRAPH Conference in 2011. In 2019, she was elected to serve on the ACM SIGGRAPH Executive Committee as director at large. In 2023 and 2024 she served as the Chair of the ACM SIGGRAPH Executive Committee

== Collectives ==
=== The DWZ ===
Kasra is an active member of the DWZ (standing for Dead White Zombies), which is a Dallas-based artist collective of 43 artists that formed in 2011. Kasra took part in the projects Flesh World, (w)hole, T.N.B., and Karaoke Motel by creating video content.

=== Collage Ensemble ===
Kasra joined the Collage Ensemble in 2005, “a Los Angeles Arts Collective of inter-disciplinary artists collaborating on multi-media artwork related to urban life and inter-ethnic experiences.” Collage Ensemble Inc. lasted from 1984 to 2015.
