= Adolphus Hotel =

Historic hotel in Dallas, Texas, US

- Hotel Adolphus
- U.S. National Register of Historic Places
- U.S. Historic district – Contributing property
- Recorded Texas Historic Landmark
- Dallas Landmark
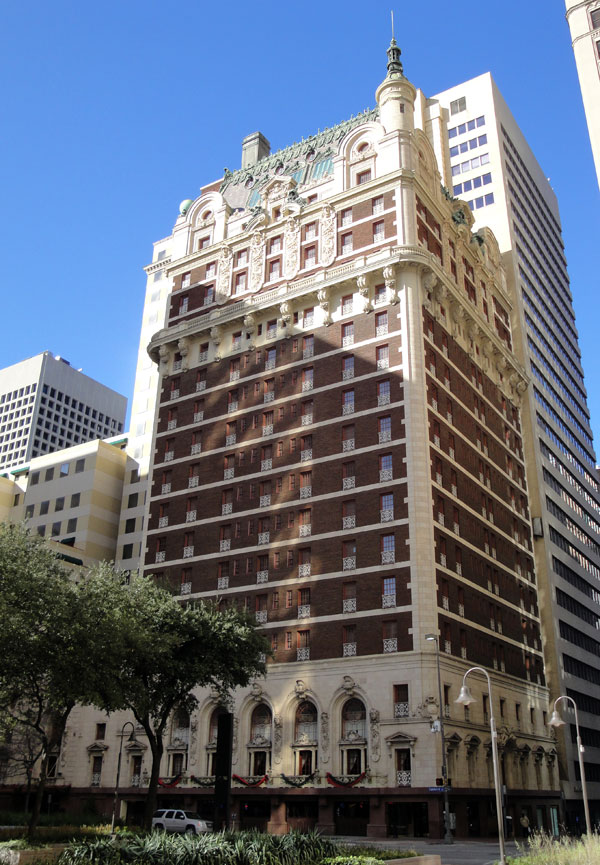
- Hotel Adolphus in 2009

- Location within Texas Location within the United States
- Location: 1321 Commerce St., Dallas, Texas
- Coordinates: 32°46′47″N 96°47′57″W
- Area: less than one acre
- Built: 1911
- Architect: Barnett, Haynes & Barnett; Tom P. Barnett
- Architectural style: Beaux-Arts
- Website: The Adolphus Hotel
- Part of: Dallas Downtown Historic District (ID04000894)
- NRHP reference No.: 83003133
- RTHL No.: 6585
- DLMK No.: H/36

Significant dates
- Added to NRHP: July 14, 1983
- Designated CP: August 11, 2006
- Designated RTHL: 1981
- Designated DLMK: September 30, 1987

The Adolphus Hotel is a historic upscale hotel established in 1912 in the Main Street District of Downtown Dallas, Texas. A Dallas Landmark, it was for several years the tallest building in the state. Today, the hotel is part of Marriott's Autograph Collection brand.

== History ==
The hotel was developed by Adolphus Busch, founder of the Anheuser-Busch company. He already owned the Oriental Hotel, across the street from the present hotel, when he was approached by a group of prominent Dallas businessmen in 1910 with the idea of constructing the first European-style luxury hotel in the city. Busch purchased Dallas's old City Hall on June 22, 1910, demolished it, and constructed the new hotel at a cost of $1.8 million. The name was announced as the New Oriental Hotel. It was designed by Thomas P. Barnett of Barnett, Haynes & Barnett of St. Louis in the Beaux Arts style. The 22-story, 312-foot (95 m) building would be the tallest in Texas until it was surpassed by the Magnolia Petroleum Building, ten years later.

By the time the hotel opened, on October 5, 1912, its name had been changed to match its builder, the Adolphus Hotel. The hotel was expanded multiple times, in 1916, 1926, and 1950, eventually filling much of a city block, and giving the hotel a total of 1,200 rooms. Under the management of Otto Schubert from 1922 to 1946, the hotel grew to national prominence. In the 1930s it was run by hotel industry pioneer Ralph Hitz's National Hotel Management Company and played host to many big band musicians of the era, including Tommy and Jimmy Dorsey, Benny Goodman and Glenn Miller.

The Adolphus has been the host of many respected leaders of business, government and entertainment, including presidents, from Warren G. Harding to George H. W. Bush. Queen Elizabeth II and Prince Philip stayed at the hotel in 1991. The hotel was a Dallas hub for entertainment and provided a platform that helped developing careers, such as Bob Hope, Jack Benny and others. North American Aviation (P-51 Mustangs, World War II) and others benefited from its position as a Texas business hub.

In 1980, the Adolphus underwent an $80 million renovation, which decreased the total number of rooms to 428 by combining multiple outdated guest rooms into larger ones. The Adolphus was added to the National Register of Historic Places in 1983. The hotel was extensively renovated again in 2017.

The hotel has been named one of the top ten in the United States by Condé Nast Traveler and also receives high ratings from Zagat, Fodor's and Frommer's.

The structure is a Dallas Landmark and listed on the National Register of Historic Places.

== Gallery ==
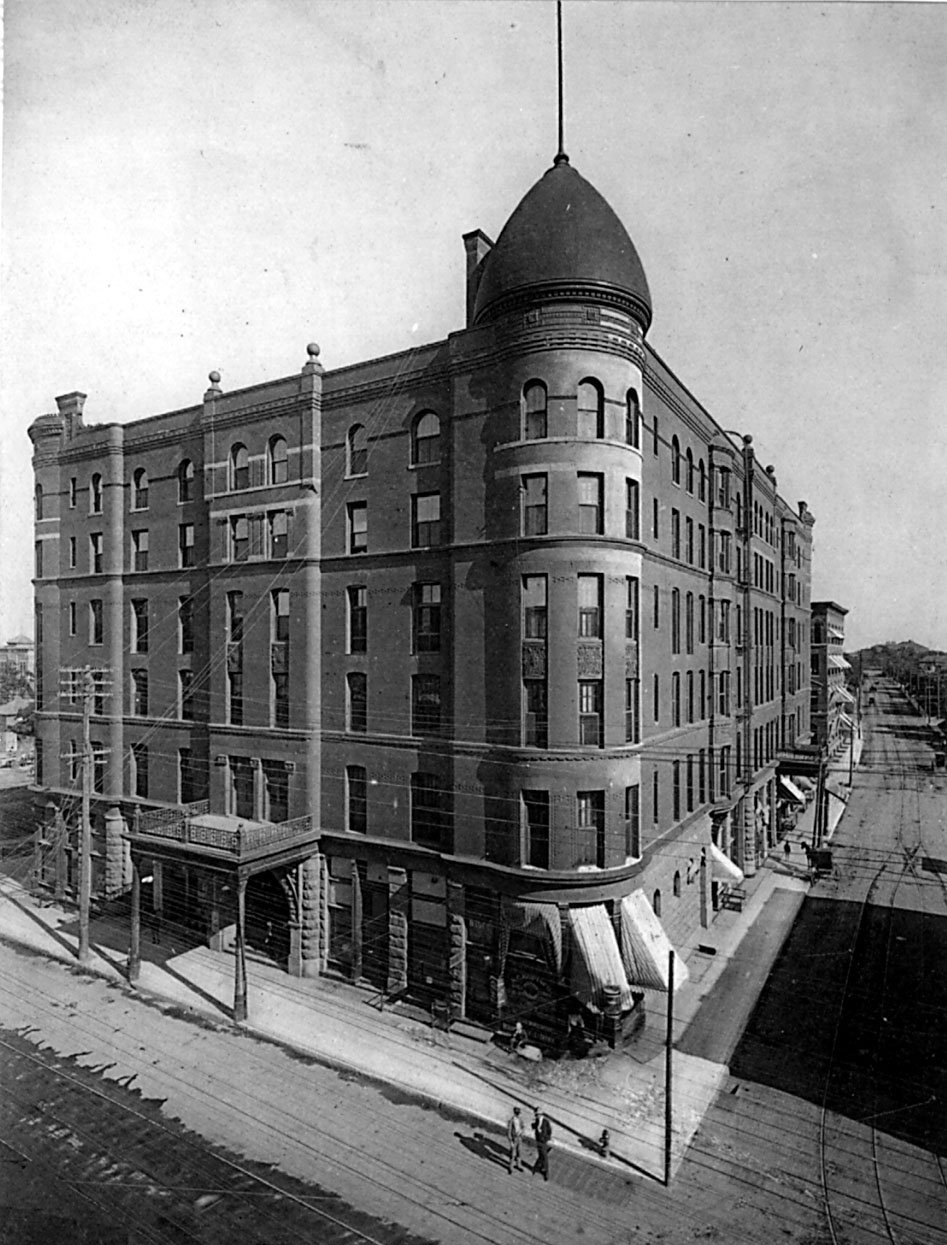
Oriental Hotel, Dallas, 1893

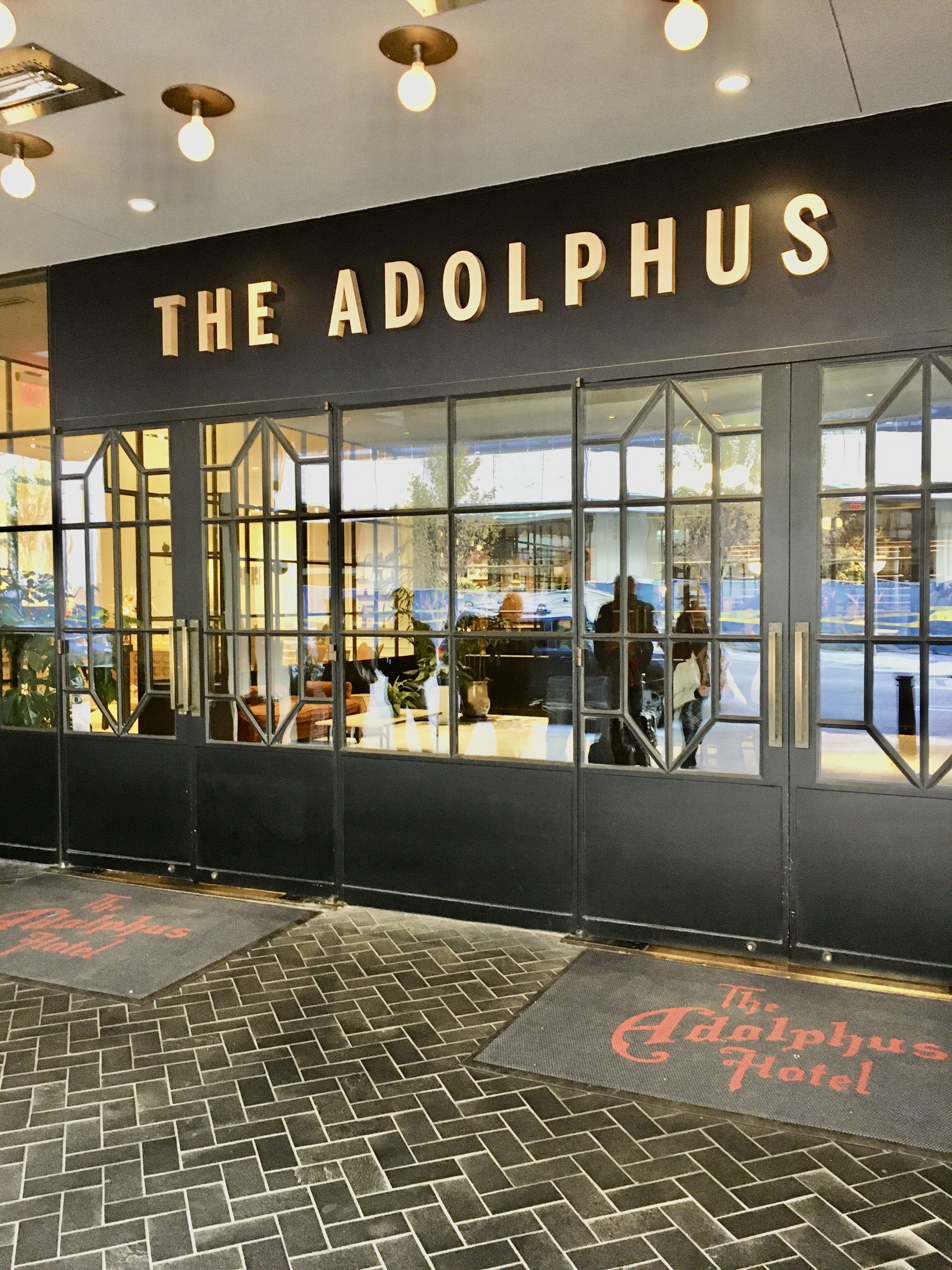
Front entrance

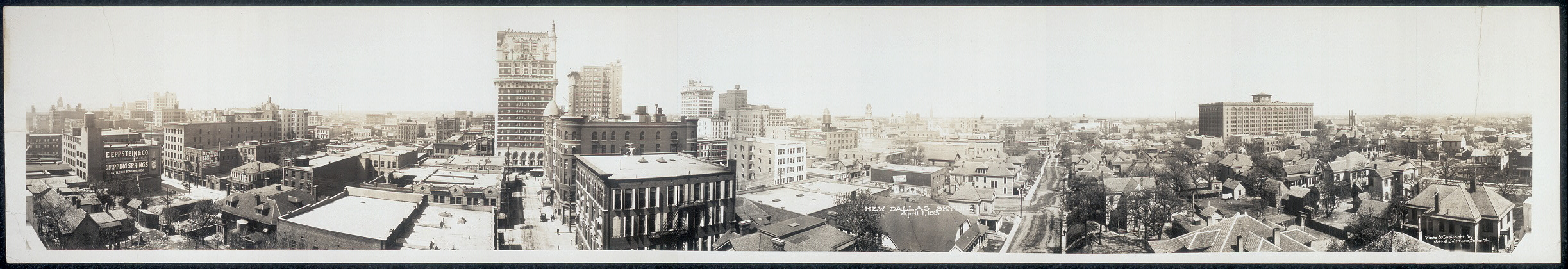
The Dallas skyline on April 1, 1913, less than a year after the Adolphus opened

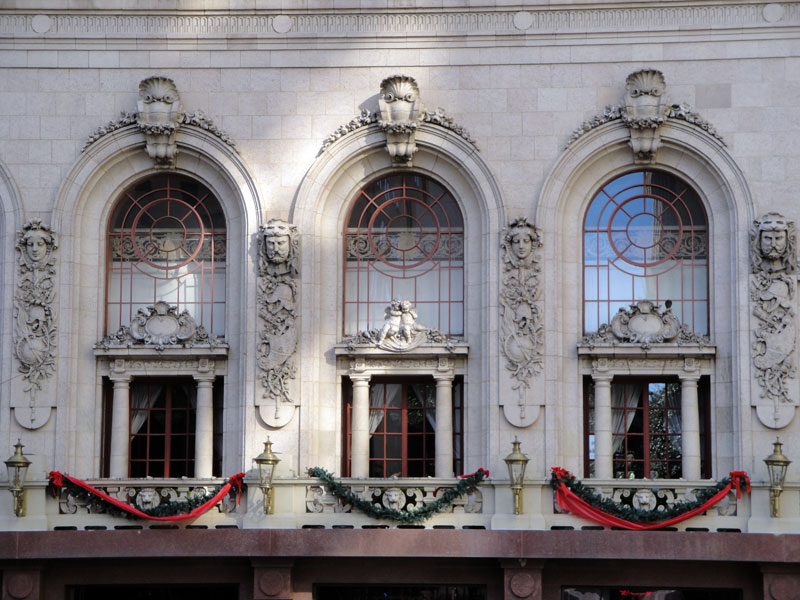
Exterior of the French Room at the Adolphus

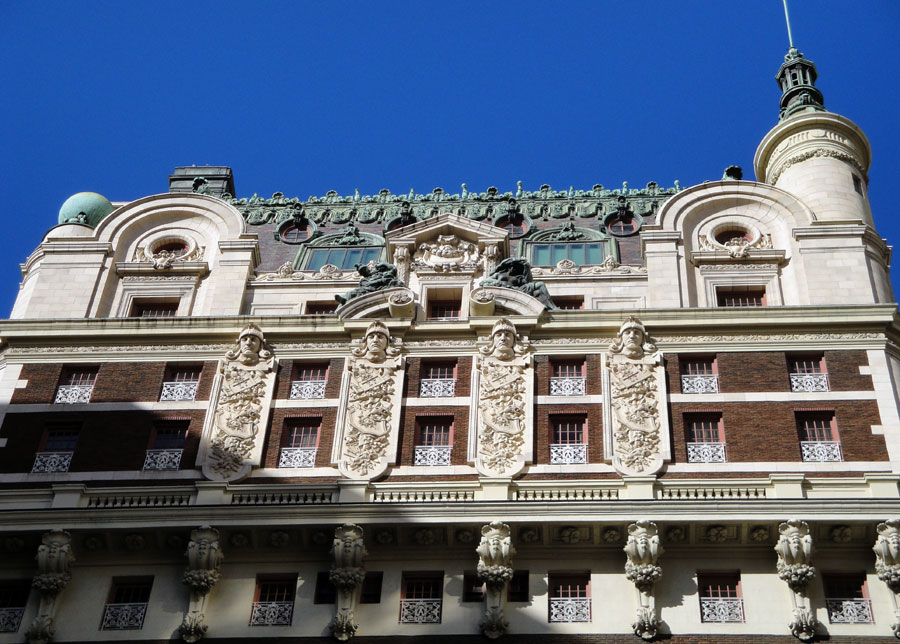
Roof detail

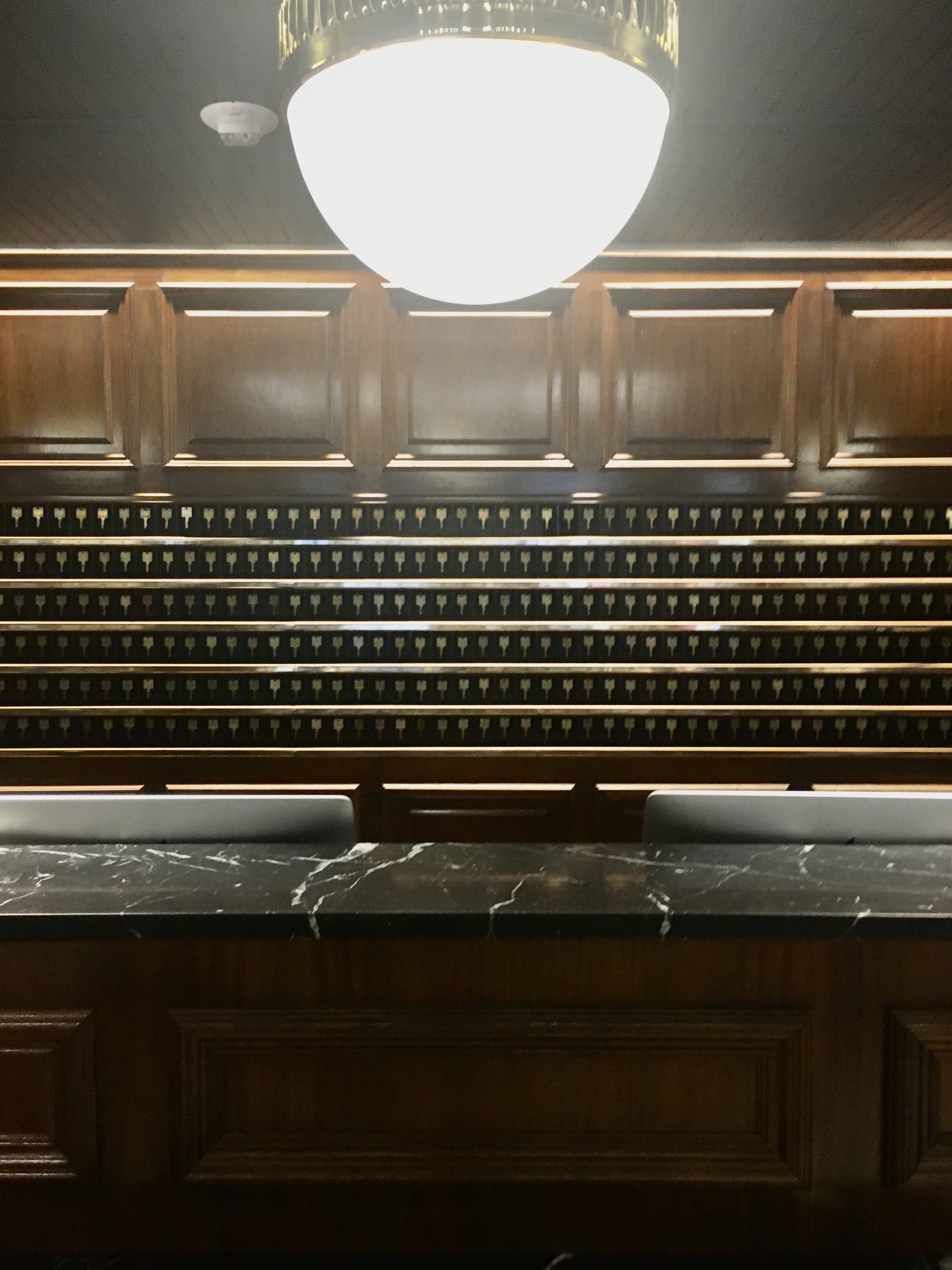
Reception desk

== See also ==
- National Register of Historic Places listings in Dallas County, Texas
- Recorded Texas Historic Landmarks in Dallas County
- List of Dallas Landmarks
