= Civic Garden Park =

Public park in Dallas, Texas, US

Civic Garden
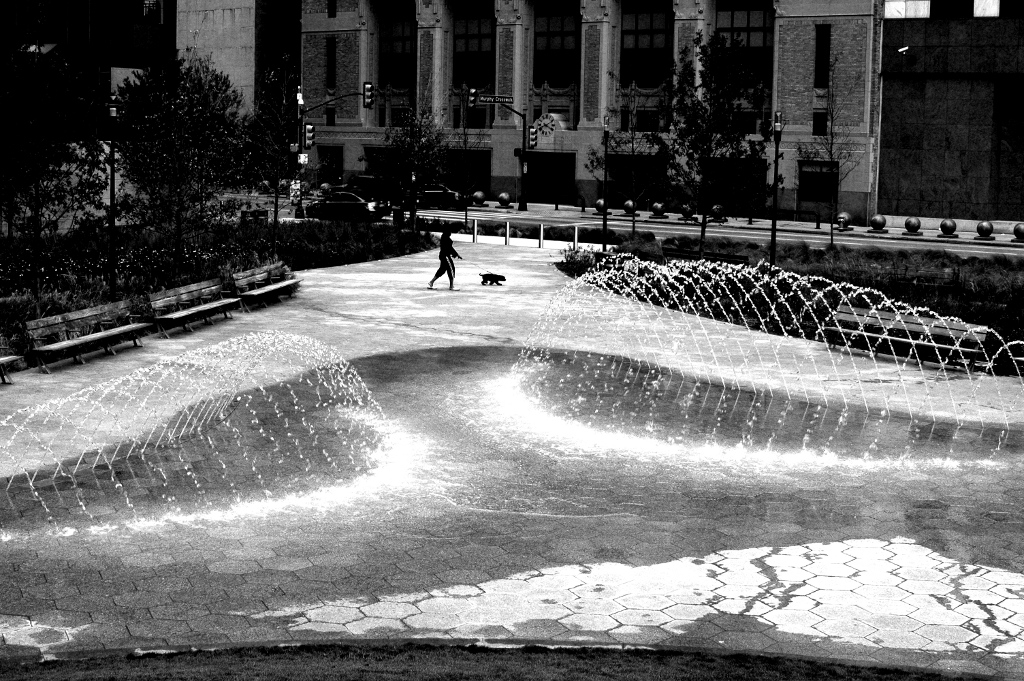
- Interactive map of Civic Garden
- Type: Public
- Location: Dallas, Texas
- Coordinates: 32°46′46″N 96°48′09″W
- Area: 1.7-acre (6,900 m^{2})
- Operator: City of Dallas
- Status: Open all year
- Website: Civic Garden

Civic Garden (formerly Belo Garden Park) is a 1.7-acre (0.69 ha) public park located in downtown Dallas, Texas, United States. The park is located between Main and Commerce, east of Griffin in the Main Street District. The park, formerly a parking lot, features perennial gardens, shaded groves, plaza spaces, an interactive fountain, a 10’ high hill which provides topographical relief and views over the central fountain plaza, and a shaded garden grove with movable tables and chairs. In 2006 Belo Corporation (the owners of Dallas-area ABC affiliate WFAA and The Dallas Morning News) committed $6.5 million toward the $14.5 million construction of the park. The park was created to honor the employees of A. H. Belo Corporation and Belo Corp., past, present and future. It is one of several new downtown parks planned and construction in downtown Dallas between 2000 and 2020.

Although scheduled for groundbreaking in 2008 the timeline was delayed due to the discovery of contaminated soil. Soil removal began in July 2010, and the park was rescheduled to open in early 2012. During development Civic Garden's design was the center of local controversy. A 12-foot wall separating the park from the adjacent Metropolitan Building was included for reasons including traffic protection and noise isolation. Professionals called this feature unneeded and anti-urban, but a resolution with Belo was not reached.

In June 2021 the name of the park was changed to Civic Garden in response to A.H. Belo Corporation changing its name to DallasNews Corporation.

== Shooting ==
On July 7, 2016, Civic Garden became the scene of a mass shooting targeting police officers. Five officers were killed and eight others injured by sniper fire. It is the deadliest attack on U.S. law enforcement since the September 11 attacks.
