= Magnolia Hotel (Dallas, Texas) =

Historic hotel in Dallas, Texas, U.S.

- Magnolia Building
- U.S. National Register of Historic Places
- U.S. Historic district – Contributing property
- Recorded Texas Historic Landmark
- Dallas Landmark
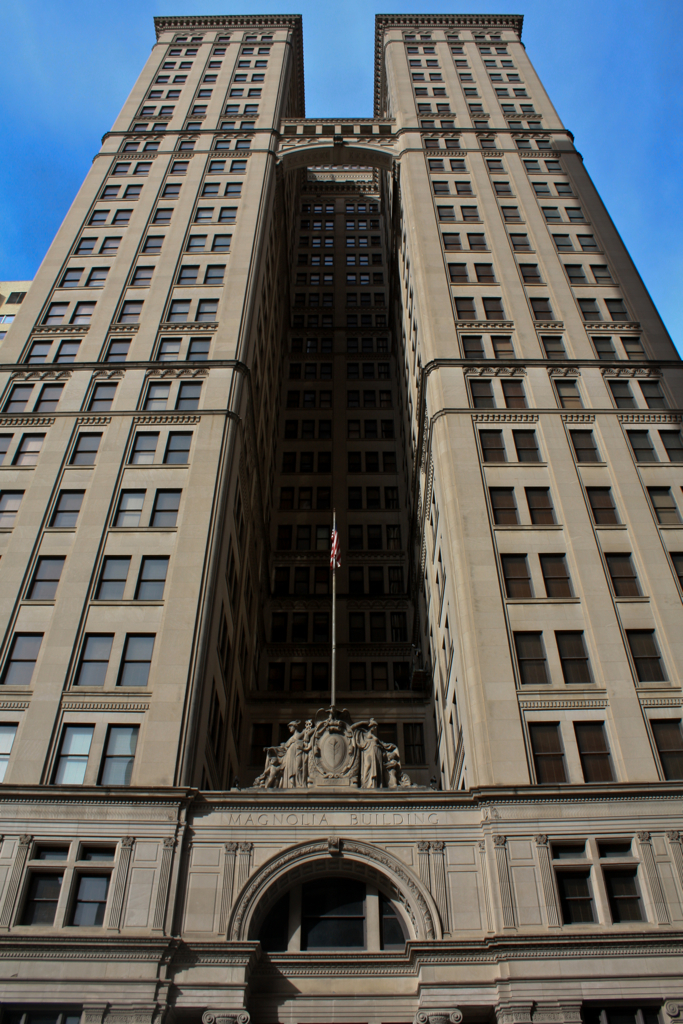
- Magnolia Building in 2009

- Location within Texas Location within the United States
- Location: 108 S. Akard St., Dallas, Texas, U.S.
- Coordinates: 32°46′48″N 96°47′56″W
- Area: 0.4 acres (0.16 ha)
- Built: 1921
- Architects: Alfred C. Bossom, Lang & Witchell
- Architectural style: Beaux-Arts, Renaissance, Skyscraper
- Website: Magnolia Dallas Downtown
- Part of: Dallas Downtown Historic District (ID04000894)
- NRHP reference No.: 78002915
- RTHL No.: 6778
- DLMK No.: H/7

Significant dates
- Added to NRHP: January 30, 1978
- Designated CP: August 11, 2006
- Designated RTHL: 1978
- Designated DLMK: December 10, 1997

The Magnolia Hotel (sometimes called the Magnolia Building, originally the Magnolia Petroleum Building) is a 29-story, Beaux-Arts style, upscale hotel in the Main Street District of downtown Dallas, Texas, United States, that for many years was the tallest building in the state after surpassing the Adolphus Hotel. The structure is a Dallas Landmark and is listed on the National Register of Historic Places.

== History ==
The building, which opened next door to the Adolphus Hotel in August 1922 at a cost of US $4 million, was originally the headquarters for the Magnolia Petroleum Company. In 1934, the company erected its trademark neon Pegasus on the building's roof (the Pegasus logo later became the logo of Mobil Oil who merged with Magnolia Petroleum in 1959) to celebrate the American Petroleum Institute's annual meeting, held in Dallas for the first time. The rotating winged horse came to represent the city of Dallas and became one of its most recognizable and endearing landmarks, even after the building became obscured by much larger skyscrapers (the neon Pegasus can now only be seen in the downtown skyline approaching from the south).

By 1974, however, Pegasus stopped rotating due to mechanical problems and in 1977 the property was sold to the city of Dallas. The building was listed in the National Register of Historic Places in 1978.

The building was purchased by Denver, Colorado developers in 1997 and was converted into the luxury 330-room Magnolia Hotel.

In 1999, in preparation for Dallas's Millennium Celebration, Pegasus was taken down to be completely restored. However, the sign was beyond repair and a new sign was recreated from scratch. At midnight on 1 January 2000, the new Pegasus, complete with rotation, was lit for the first time. A copy of the original sign, which sat atop a Mobil Oil station in the Casa Linda neighborhood of Dallas for many decades, is now on display at the Old Red Museum.

== Gallery ==
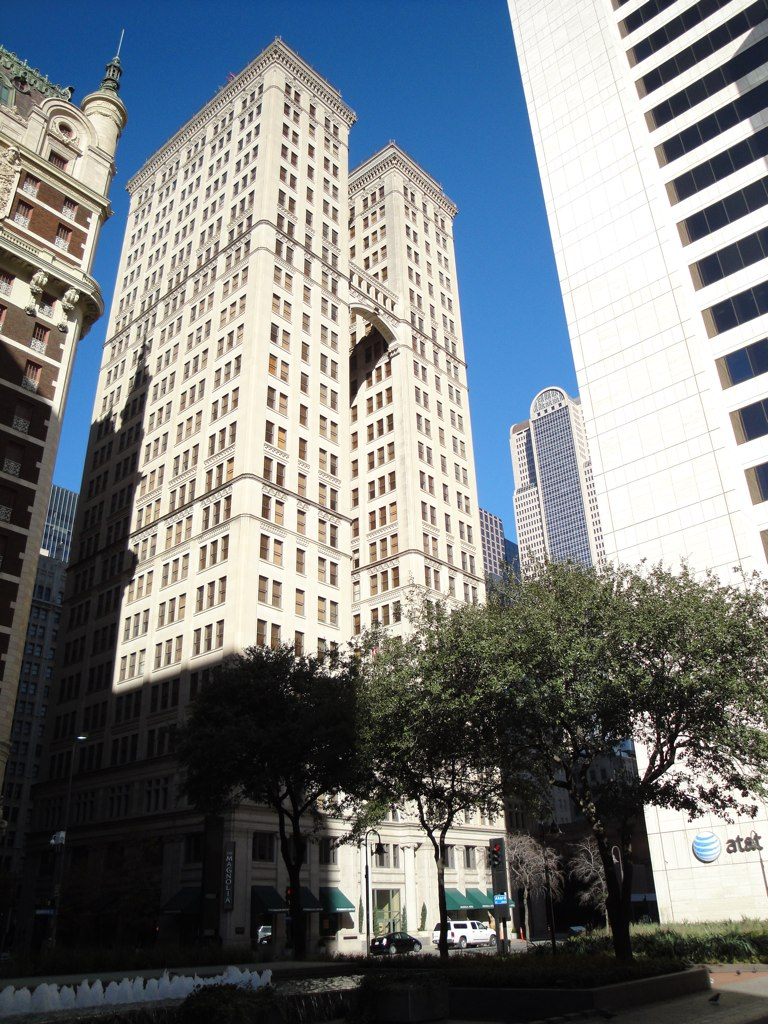

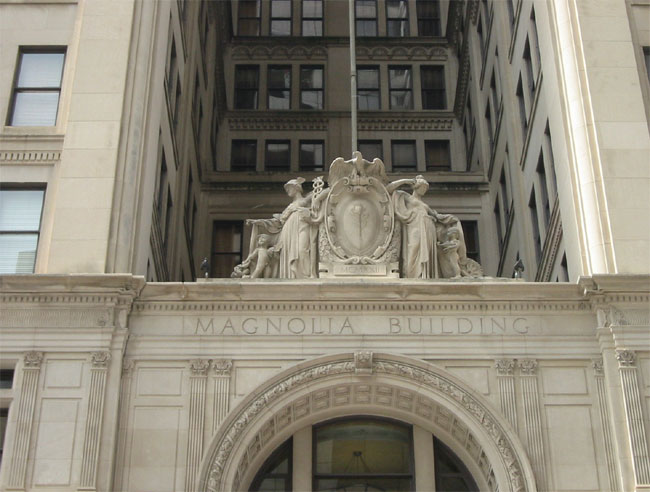

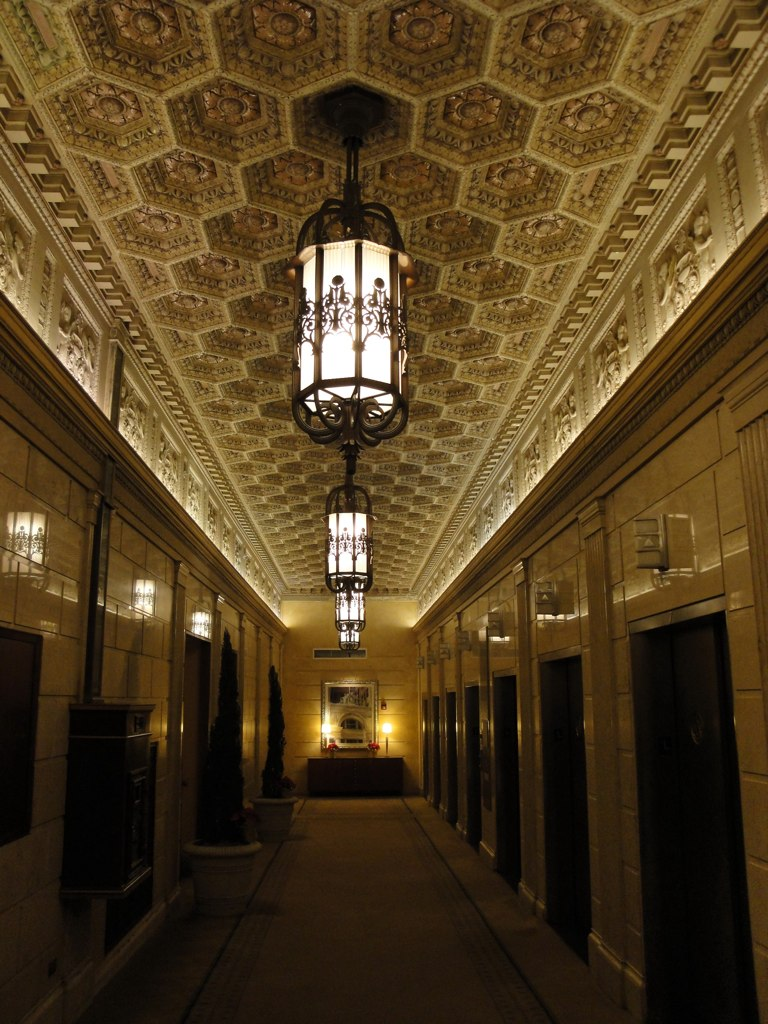
Elevator lobby in the Magnolia Building

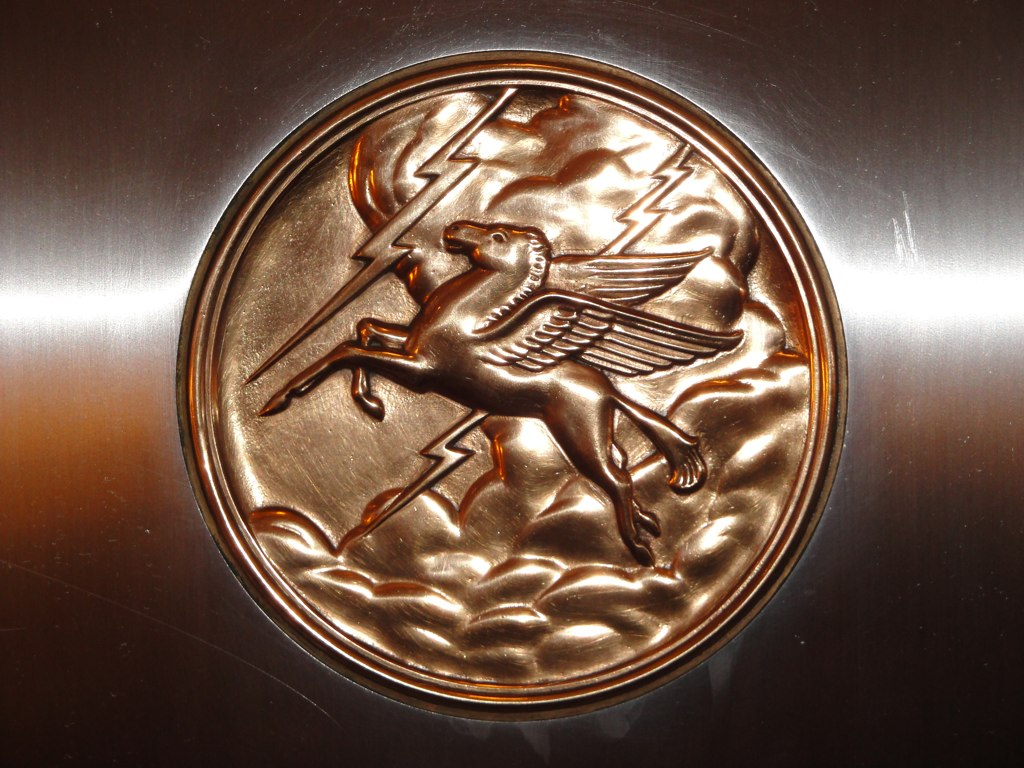
Pegasus elevator medallion

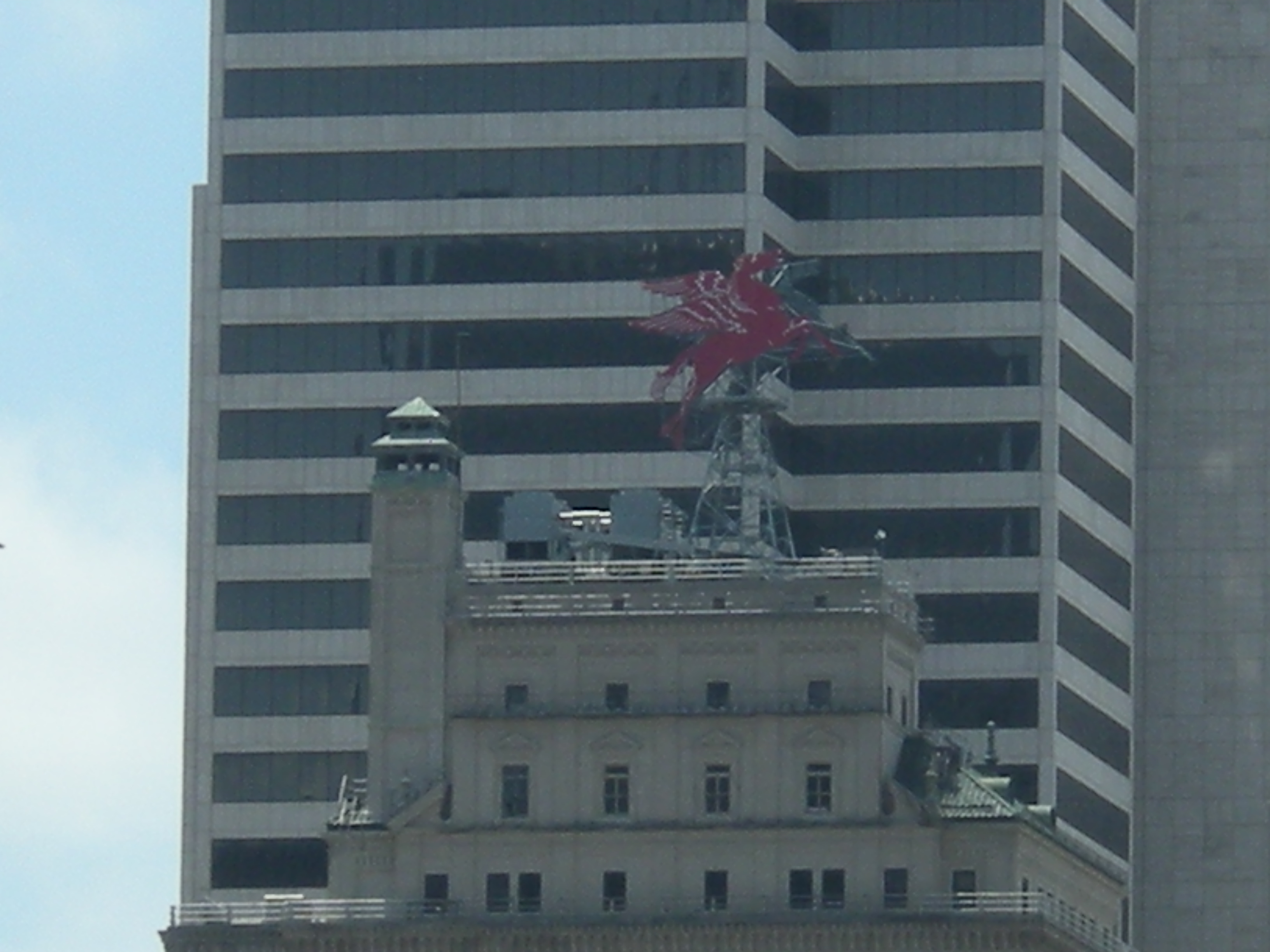
Photo of the roof in which the red pegasus is placed

== See also ==
- List of buildings and structures in Dallas, Texas
- National Register of Historic Places listings in Dallas County, Texas
- Recorded Texas Historic Landmarks in Dallas County
- List of Dallas Landmarks
