= Charles D. Hill =

American architect

Charles Dexter Hill
- Born: October 23, 1873; Edwardsville, Illinois
- Died: January 2, 1926 (aged 52); Dallas, Texas
- Occupation: Architect
- Buildings: Dallas Municipal Building; Galveston City Hall; Republic National Bank Building; Buildings for Southern Methodist University

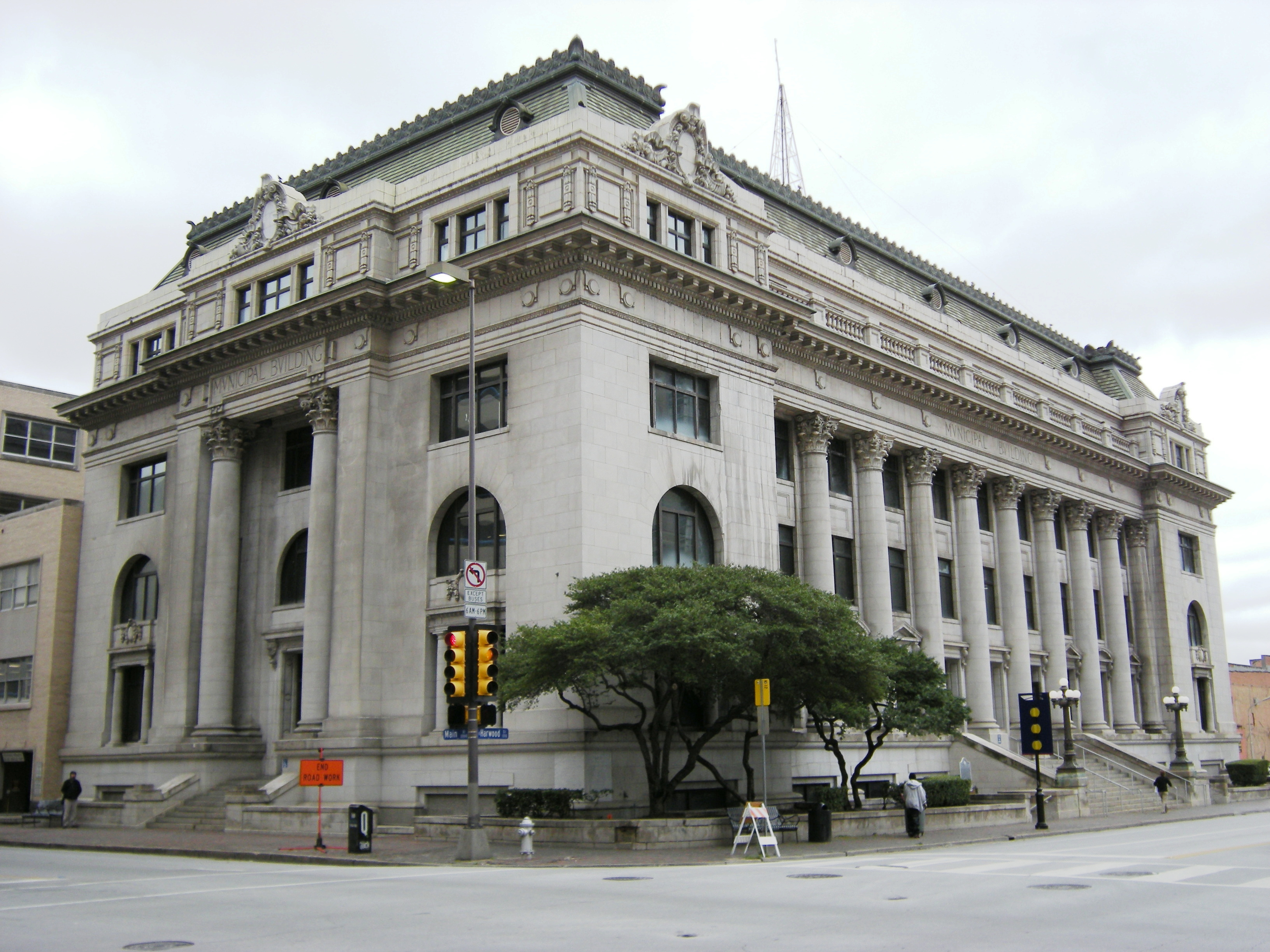
Municipal Building, Dallas, Texas. 1912.

Charles D. Hill (October 23, 1873 – January 1, 1926) was an American architect practicing in Dallas, Texas during the first three decades of the twentieth century.

== Life and career ==
Charles Dexter Hill was born October 23, 1873, in Edwardsville, Illinois. He attended Valparaiso University from 1894 to 1895 before returning to Edwardsville. He worked as a draftsman for architects Charles Pauly of Edwardsville and Frederick C. Bonsack FAIA of St. Louis. For a few years he also operated a small practice of his own in Edwardsville, and briefly formed a partnership with Theodore C. Kistner in Granite City. Hill came to Texas in 1903, joining the office of Sanguinet & Staats in Fort Worth. In 1905 he was sent to Dallas to manage a new branch office. He became a partner in 1906, with the Dallas office now known as Sanguinet, Staats & Hill. In 1907 Hill bought the Dallas office outright, renaming it C. D. Hill & Company. The new firm quickly gained a statewide reputation, and a second office in Houston was established in 1908. In 1914 a third was added at Galveston, under the management of H. F. Davis, though this appears to have been discontinued after a few years.

His partners in C. D. Hill & Company were Douglas F. Coburn and Herschell D. Smith. The partnership was active until Hill's death in early 1926, when it was succeeded by Coburn, Smith & Evans (1926–1927), Coburn & Smith (1927–1928), Coburn & Fowler (1928 – c. 1931) and D. F. Coburn. The firm operated under Douglas F. Coburn until 1939, when he relocated to Shreveport, Louisiana, where he worked with the noted firm of Edward F. Neild until his retirement in 1955.

== Personal life ==
Hill joined the American Institute of Architects in 1917.

Hill was married twice and had three children. He died January 2, 1926, in Dallas at the age of 52.

== Legacy ==
Most of Hill's larger works are neoclassical buildings reflecting the Beaux-Arts movement. He also worked in other popular revival styles, including Colonial Revival and Gothic Revival, usually for residences and churches, respectively. Other projects, including the city halls of Galveston and Woodward, Oklahoma exhibit elements of Renaissance Revival architecture.

At least ten buildings designed by Hill and his partners have been listed on the United States National Register of Historic Places, and others contribute to listed historic districts.

The noted architect Joseph Finger was an employee in the firm's Houston office from 1908 to 1913.

== Architectural works ==
Year	Building	Address	City	State	Notes	Image	Reference
1908	House for Charles D. Hill	4938 Junius St	Dallas	Texas	The architect's first Dallas area home. A contributing property to the Munger Place Historic District, listed on the National Register of Historic Places in 1978.		
1908	House for Edward O. Tenison	3001 Turtle Creek Blvd	Dallas	Texas	Demolished in 1947.		
1909	Coliseum (former), Fair Park	3921 Martin Luther King Jr Blvd	Dallas	Texas	Renovated in the Art Deco style in 1936 to serve as the Hall of Administration for the Texas Centennial Exposition. Most recently used as the Women's Museum.		
1909	Hillsboro City Hall (former)	3127 E Franklin St	Hillsboro	Texas			
1909	House for Collett H. Munger	5400 Swiss Ave	Dallas	Texas	A contributing property to the Swiss Avenue Historic District, listed on the National Register of Historic Places in 1974.		
1909	South Texas National Bank Building	215 Main St	Houston	Texas	Listed on the National Register of Historic Places in 1978, but was demolished in 1983.		
1910	Bender Hotel	911 Walker St	Houston	Texas	Demolished in 2005.		
1910	House for George W. Bottoms	500 Hickory St	Texarkana	Arkansas	In association with Witt & Seibert of Texarkana. Listed on the National Register of Historic Places in 1982.		
1910	House for Edgar Flippen	4800 Preston Road	Dallas	Texas	This home is Hill's first Highland Park commission.		
1911	First Presbyterian Church of Dallas	1835 Young St	Dallas	Texas	A contributing property to the Dallas Downtown Historic District, listed on the National Register of Historic Places in 2006.		
1911	Nueces Hotel	601 N Water St	Corpus Christi	Texas	Demolished in 1970.		
1911	Oak Lawn Methodist Church	3014 Oak Lawn Ave	Dallas	Texas	Listed on the National Register of Historic Places in 1988.		
1911	Dallas Country Club	4125 Mockingbird Lane	Dallas	Texas	The clubhouse was demolished in 1956.	||	
1912	House for Henry Lee Edwards	4500 Preston Road	Dallas	Texas	The home was designed for Henry Lee Edwards who co-founded the Dallas Country Club. It later sold in 1961 to real estate developer Trammell Crow and remained in the family before selling to Andy Beal who demolished the home in 2017.		
1912	Dallas Municipal Building	106 S Harwood St	Dallas	Texas	In association with Mauran, Russell & Crowell of St. Louis as consulting architects. A contributing property to the Dallas Downtown Historic District, listed on the National Register of Historic Places in 2006.		
1912	House for E. C. McCartney	603 W Marvin Ave	Waxahachie	Texas	Listed on the National Register of Historic Places in 1986.		
1913	Lakewood Country Club	6430 Gaston Ave	Dallas	Texas	The first clubhouse which was demolished in 1960.	Lakewood_Country_Club,_Dallas,_Tex._(27469794892)	
1913	Sherman Hall, Austin College	900 N Grand Ave	Sherman	Texas			
1913	Thompson Hall, Austin College	900 N Grand Ave	Sherman	Texas			
1914	Trinity Presbyterian Church	104 E 10th St	Dallas	Texas	Demolished.		
1916	Central Presbyterian Church	402 N College St	Waxahachie	Texas	Listed on the National Register of Historic Places in 1987.		
1916	City Temple of the Central Presbyterian Church	Patterson and N Akard Sts	Dallas	Texas	Demolished in 1963.		
1916	East Dallas Presbyterian Church	2240 Swiss Ave	Dallas	Texas	Demolished.		
1916	Galveston City Hall	823 Rosenberg St	Galveston	Texas	Listed on the National Register of Historic Places in 1984.		
1917	Woodward City Hall	1219 8th St	Woodward	Oklahoma			
1920	First Presbyterian Church of Ferris	205 N Church St	Ferris	Texas			
1921	Blackstone Hotel	N Broadway Ave and E Locust St	Tyler	Texas	Demolished in 1985.		
1921	First Baptist Church of Houston	1010 Lamar St	Houston	Texas	Demolished.		
1921	Palace Theatre	1625 Elm St	Dallas	Texas	Demolished.		
1921	Y. W. C. A. Building	206 N Haskell Ave	Dallas	Texas	Demolished in 2007.		
1923	Melrose Court	3015 Oak Lawn Ave	Dallas	Texas			
1923	Republic National Bank Building	1309 Main St	Dallas	Texas	Now known as the Drakestone, and formerly the Davis Building, under which name it was listed on the National Register of Historic Places in 2006.		
1924	House for Charles D. Hill	3318 Beverly Dr	Highland Park	Texas	The architect's second Dallas area home.		
1924	House for Fred Schoelkopf	3905 Beverly Drive	Dallas	Texas	The home was later sold to businessman Sam Wyly. In 2017 The home was sold once more, at this point the home underwent a major renovation which was completed in 2021. The renovation maintained the original CD Hill design.		
1925	Hyer Hall, Southern Methodist University	6425 Boaz Ln	University Park	Texas	Listed on the National Register of Historic Places in 1980.		
1925	Warwick Hotel	5701 S Main St	Houston	Texas	Now known as the Hotel ZaZa.		
1926	State National Bank Building	101 N Beaton St	Corsicana	Texas	In association with Harry O. Blanding of Corsicana. A contributing property to the Corsicana Commercial Historic District, listed on the National Register of Historic Places in 1995.		
1927	Dallas National Bank Building	1530 Main St	Dallas	Texas	Credited to Coburn, Smith & Evans. Listed on the National Register of Historic Places in 2005.		
1928	Stanley Patterson Hall, Southern Methodist University	6425 Boaz Ln	University Park	Texas	Credited to Coburn & Smith. Listed on the National Register of Historic Places in 1980.		
