= DataBank DFW1 =

Data center and former bank building in Dallas, Texas, US

- The building in 2022
- Former names: Federal Reserve Bank of Dallas Building

General information
- Type: Data center
- Architectural style: Beaux-Arts, Classical Revival
- Location: 400 S. Akard St. Government District, Dallas, Texas, U.S.
- Coordinates: 32.77813°N 96.79897°W
- Opened: 1921
- Renovated: 1940; 1959; 1999

Technical details
- Floor count: 7
- Floor area: 269,600 square feet (25,050 m^{2})

Design and construction
- Architect: Graham, Anderson, Probst & White
- Main contractor: George A. Fuller Company
- Former Federal Reserve Bank
- U.S. Historic district – Contributing property
- Dallas Landmark
- Part of: Dallas Downtown Historic District (ID04000894)

Significant dates
- Designated CP: August 11, 2006
- Designated DLMK: October 5, 1977

DataBank DFW1 is a data center in the Government District in Dallas, Texas, occupying the historic Federal Reserve Bank of Dallas Building. The building was built for the Federal Reserve Bank of Dallas, and opened in 1921 during a period of rapid expansion for the Dallas Fed and its member banks. It served as the headquarters of the Dallas Fed until 1992, and was remodeled into a data center during the dot-com bubble of the late 1990s.

The building is currently the flagship data center and corporate headquarters of its operator DataBank. The building was designated as a Dallas Landmark in 1977, and was designated as a contributing property to the Dallas Downtown Historic District in 2006.

== History ==
The Federal Reserve System, the United States' central bank, was created in 1913 in the aftermath of the Panic of 1907. The Federal Reserve Act specified that there would be eight to twelve regional Federal Reserve Banks, and a three-member committee would designate their locations. A total of 37 cities applied, including Dallas, Houston, and Fort Worth. Dallas leaders made significant efforts to nominate their city for a Federal Reserve Bank, including a trip by a banker and a Dallas Morning News reporter to St. Louis to set up an impromptu meeting with Postmaster General Albert S. Burleson onboard a train back to Dallas.

The Federal Reserve Bank of Dallas opened for business in a former commercial bank building on Main Street on November 16, 1914. In 1915, the Dallas Fed purchased a building on Commerce Street that was formerly occupied by a jewelry wholesaler. By 1918, the bank had already outgrown the Commerce Street office, and was leasing space in three adjacent buildings. A lot at Wood and Akard Streets was purchased, and was surveyed by the City Engineer of the city of Dallas, as the services of private engineers were not available due to World War I. The city refused to accept payment for its services, and the bank provided $250 worth of technical books to the City Engineer's office as alternate compensation.

Graham, Anderson, Probst & White of Chicago designed the building, and the George A. Fuller Company was awarded the contract for construction in June 1919. The foundation and structural steel were complete by the end of 1919, and a cornerstone laying ceremony was held on April 2, 1920.

The first departments moved into the building in December 1920, and the building was fully completed in March 1921. The building, initially five stories tall, featured elaborate decoration on the exterior, including carved stone statues over the main entrance and an ornamental cornice above the third floor.

Circa 1940s postcard of the building

By the late 1930s, the Dallas Fed's operations had expanded substantially due to the Great Depression's effect on the banking system. The bank's expanded staff included temporary workers handling operations for the Reconstruction Finance Corporation and the Commodity Credit Corporation, who were often relegated to the hallways of the existing building. Dallas architect Grayson Gill designed an addition to the rear of the building in a distinct, less ornamented architectural style. Plans for the addition, which also included the construction of a sixth and seventh floor and new air conditioning systems, were finalized in September 1939. The expansion project cost $600,000 ($10.6 million in 2024), and the addition was formally dedicated in early 1941.

A large annex was constructed in 1959 at the rear of the building. The work of moving the treasury from the original building's vaults to the annex's vaults took multiple days, and was remembered by one former Federal Reserve employee as "back-breaking work." The 1921 building's cornice was removed in 1960 after concerns about structural integrity. The building was designated as a Dallas Landmark in 1977, protecting its exterior from demolition or significant alteration. Historian Harvey J. Graff wrote in its nomination that "the Federal Reserve Bank of Dallas continues to provide an appropriate and important physical testament to the history and the character of the city’s development: past, present, and future."

The Dallas Fed began considering a replacement for the building in the late 1980s due to the age and condition of the buildings, and concluded that any replacement would have to be built on a new site. The new site was announced in late 1989, located at Pearl Street and the Woodall Rodgers Freeway. The move to the new building occurred in 1992, taking a full day with 16 armored truck trips. Following the bank's move to its new location, the Akard Street property was listed for sale with an asking price of $3.5 million. The listing advertised the property's unique features, which included a shooting range, 4 large vaults, and a 284-seat cafeteria.

The building ultimately sold for approximately $1 million (equivalent to $1.9 million in 2024) in 1995. Local real estate company Barker-Nichols purchased the building, and the City of Dallas considered it as a site for the new headquarters for the Dallas Police Department. The new headquarters would replace the department's existing headquarters in the Old City Hall, which were inadequate for the department's needs. The Police Department headquarters proposal was unsuccessful.

The building was remodeled into a carrier hotel in 1999 by Los Angeles firm Telecom Real Estate Services. A carrier hotel, also known as a colocation center, is a specialized type of data center that features a large meet-me room, which allows the facility's customers to connect to a large number of telecommunications providers. In addition to its security features, the site was appealing due to its proximity to a Southwestern Bell facility, which provided high-quality fiber-optic connectivity. The 1999 renovation removed the office interior, replacing it with space for computer equipment, but retained the former bank vaults.

The building was listed as a contributing property to the Dallas Downtown Historic District in 2006. The building was sold to Digital Realty Trust in 2012 under a leaseback agreement, where DataBank would continue to operate the facility. DataBank expanded its operations in the former Federal Reserve building in 2014, adding 4 megawatts of power to the building's existing 3-megawatt capacity.

In a 2026 interview, DataBank CEO Raul Martynek argued that the facility was fundamentally different from larger-scale AI data centers, and that converting existing buildings to data centers was no longer common practice. Martynek argued that "We found a building that had space and some characteristics to put computer equipment in it, and those buildings became quote unquote data centers. If it’s happening [now], it’s happening in small amounts." When the Dallas facility was being redeveloped as a data center in the 1990s, Telecom Real Estate Services was simultaneously engaged in a similar project in Downtown Los Angeles in a former J. W. Robinson's department store building. Other data center conversion projects in Dallas include the Univision Tower and the Infomart.

== Architecture ==
Detail of the decoration above the main entrance

The Federal Reserve Bank of Dallas building was designed in the Beaux-Arts style by the Chicago firm of Graham, Anderson, Probst & White. The design of the original building emphasized an "effect of stability and permanence," representing the Federal Reserve as an institution. A group of sculptures above the main entrance feature the "11-K" seal of the Federal Reserve Bank of Dallas, flanked by figures representing "Integrity" and "Protection." The 1921 building's exterior is largely intact, except for the removal of the cornice in the 1960s and modifications to ground-floor windows.

The 1939 addition to the building was designed by Dallas architect Grayson Gill in the Modernist style, with notably less ornamentation.

== Specifications ==
According to DataBank, the facility has a power capacity of 7 megawatts.

The Dallas Morning News reported in 2026 that the DFW1 facility used 51.5 million US gallons (195,000,000 L) of water per year. In comparison, the nearby Infomart was responsible for approximately 80 million US gallons (300,000,000 L) annually.

== See also ==
- Infomart
