= Harwood Historic District =

Harwood Street Historic District
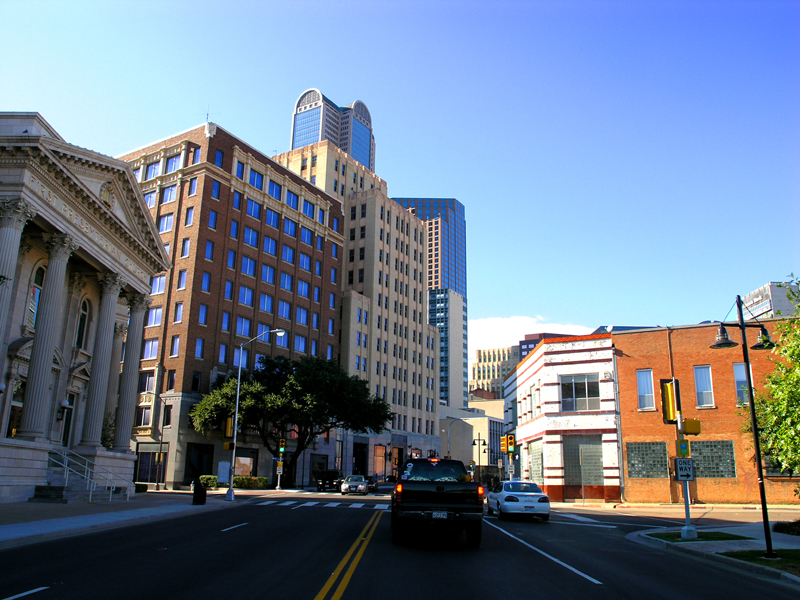
- Harwood Historic District structures

- Harwood Street Historic District (the United States)
- 32°46′50″N 96°47′38″W
- Type: Historic district
- Location: Along Harwood St. from Canton St. to Pacific Ave., Dallas, Texas

History
- Built: 1888-1955

Site notes
- Architectural styles: Italianate, Beaux-Arts, Sullivanesque, Neo-classical, Renaissance Revival, Art Moderne, Art Deco, Modern
- Governing body: Dallas Landmark Commission

Dallas Landmark
- Designated: February 28, 1990
- Reference no.: H/48

The Harwood Street Historic District is a historic commercial district and Dallas Landmark District on the east end of downtown Dallas, Texas lying in parts of the City Center District, Main Street District and Farmers Market District. The locally protected district generally encompasses structures in the blocks fronting Harwood Street from Pacific Avenue to Canton Street.

The district represents a cross-section of Dallas commercial architecture from the 1880s to the 1950s. Styles range from Italianate to Beaux-Arts, Sullivanesque, Neo-classical, Renaissance Revival, Art Moderne, Art Deco and Modern.

== History ==
At the turn of the twentieth century, Harwood Street carried merchants and bankers from their mansions in The Cedars to their offices downtown and back home again at night. In the 1920s it was scene shop row, home to the city's vaudeville suppliers.

In 1990 the area was designated a local historic district. Most of the area became part of the larger Dallas Downtown Historic District in 2009.

== Contributing structures ==
The following structures are considered contributing properties of the Harwood Historic District and were constructed over a period of six decades. Many of them have been re-purposed for residential or commercial uses with few alterations to their historical appearance. Others await restoration and are currently vacant.

Building Name	Address	Constructed
Hart Furniture Building	1933 Elm Street	1888
Dallas Scottish Rite Temple	500 S. Harwood Street	1910-1913
First Presbyterian Church	401 S. Harwood Street	1912, 1948
Dallas Municipal Building and Annex	106 S. Harwood Street	1914, 1954
Majestic Theatre	1923 Elm Street	1920
Lone Star Gas Company (south building)	1915 Wood Street	1924
Dallas Hilton	1933 Main Street	1925
Film Exchange Building	310-314 S. Harwood Street	1925
Titche-Goettinger Building	1900 Elm Street	1929, 1955
Warner Brothers (Vitagraph) Film Exchange Building	508 Park Avenue	1929-1930
Desco Tile Company	1908 Canton Street	1930
Lone Star Gas Company (north building)	301 S. Harwood Street	1931
Tower Petroleum Building	1907 Elm Street	1931
Paramount Pictures Building	412 S. Harwood Street	1934
Masonic Temple	501 S. Harwood Street	1941
Masonic Relief	1910 Young Street	1941
Old Dallas Central Library	1954 Commerce Street	1955

== See also ==
- List of Dallas Landmarks
