= JW Marriott Downtown Houston =

Historic building in Houston, Texas

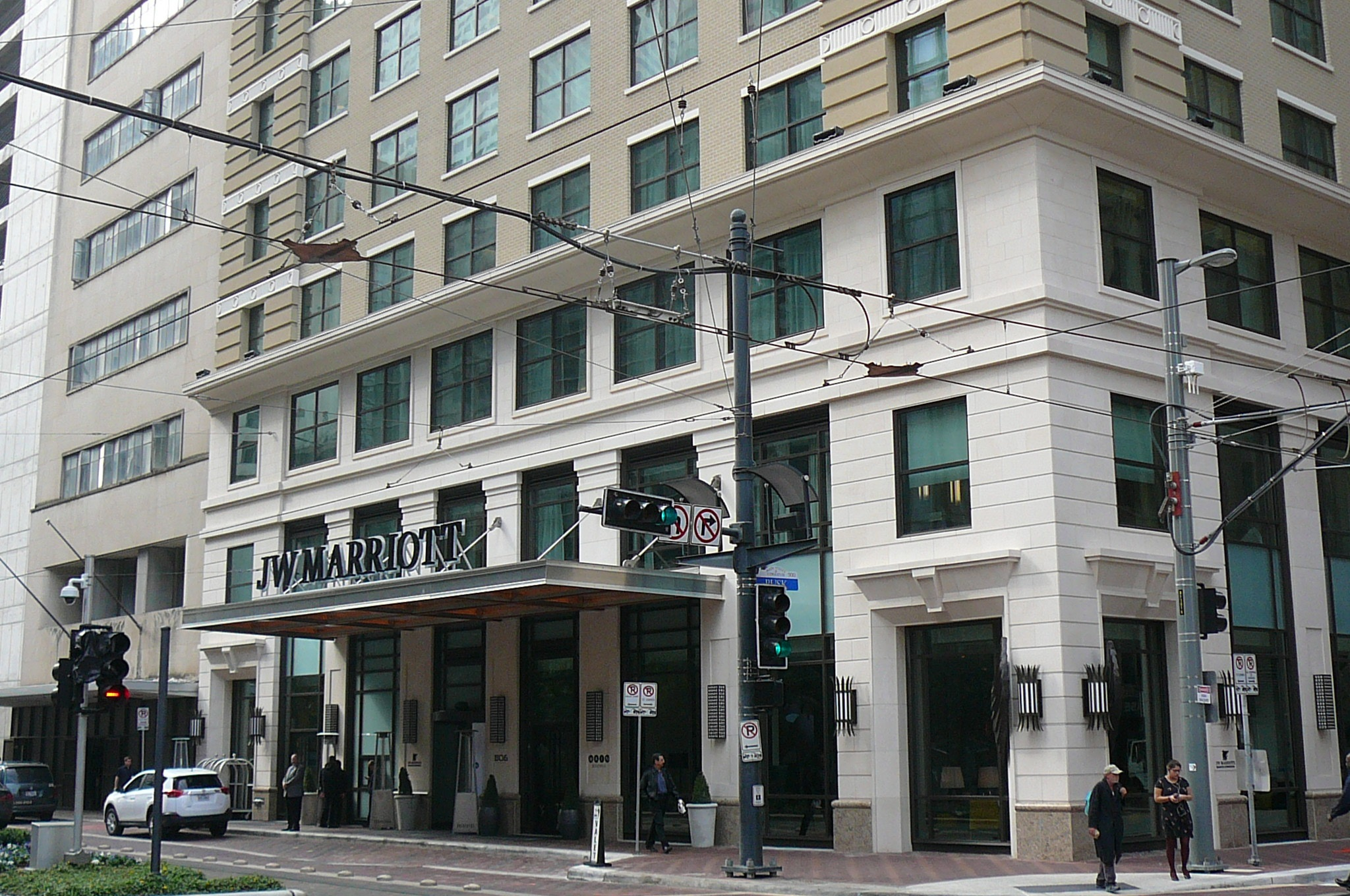
- Main Street Entrance

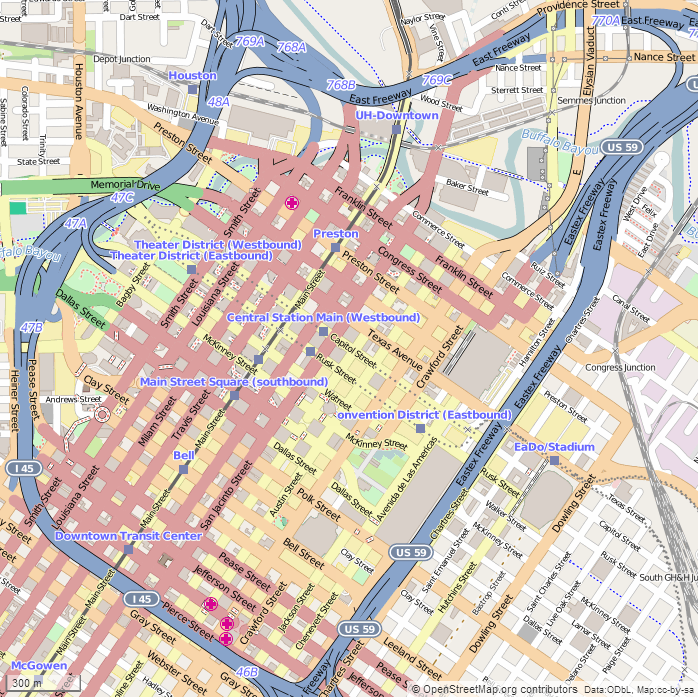
- Location within Houston Downtown

General information
- Location: Houston, Texas; United States
- Coordinates: 29.7584°N 95.3641°W
- Opening: 2014
- Operator: Marriott Hotels & Resorts

Technical details
- Floor count: 22

Other information
- Number of rooms: 270
- Number of suites: 58
- Number of restaurants: 1
- Parking: Valet Parking

Website
- marriott.com

The JW Marriott Downtown Houston is a hotel located at 806 Main Street in Downtown Houston, which opened in 2014. It had been previously known as the Carter Building, and was the tallest building in Texas when it opened in 1910. The building was renamed Second National Bank Building in 1923.

== History ==
Samuel Fain Carter, the founder of Lumberman's Bank in Houston, commissioned the architecture firm of Sanguinet and Staats to design a sixteen-floor, steel-framed building on Main Street at the corner of Rusk Street in Houston. The Fort Worth-based Sanguinet and Staats had already been building skyscrapers in various cities in Texas, and was building a reputation for this type of structure. In 1909, the building had an estimated cost of $650,000. Carter planned to finance construction through issues of equity and debt, stipulating that he would restrict bonds to $400,000 in value. The Rice Institute agreed to purchase up to $200,000 in bonds.

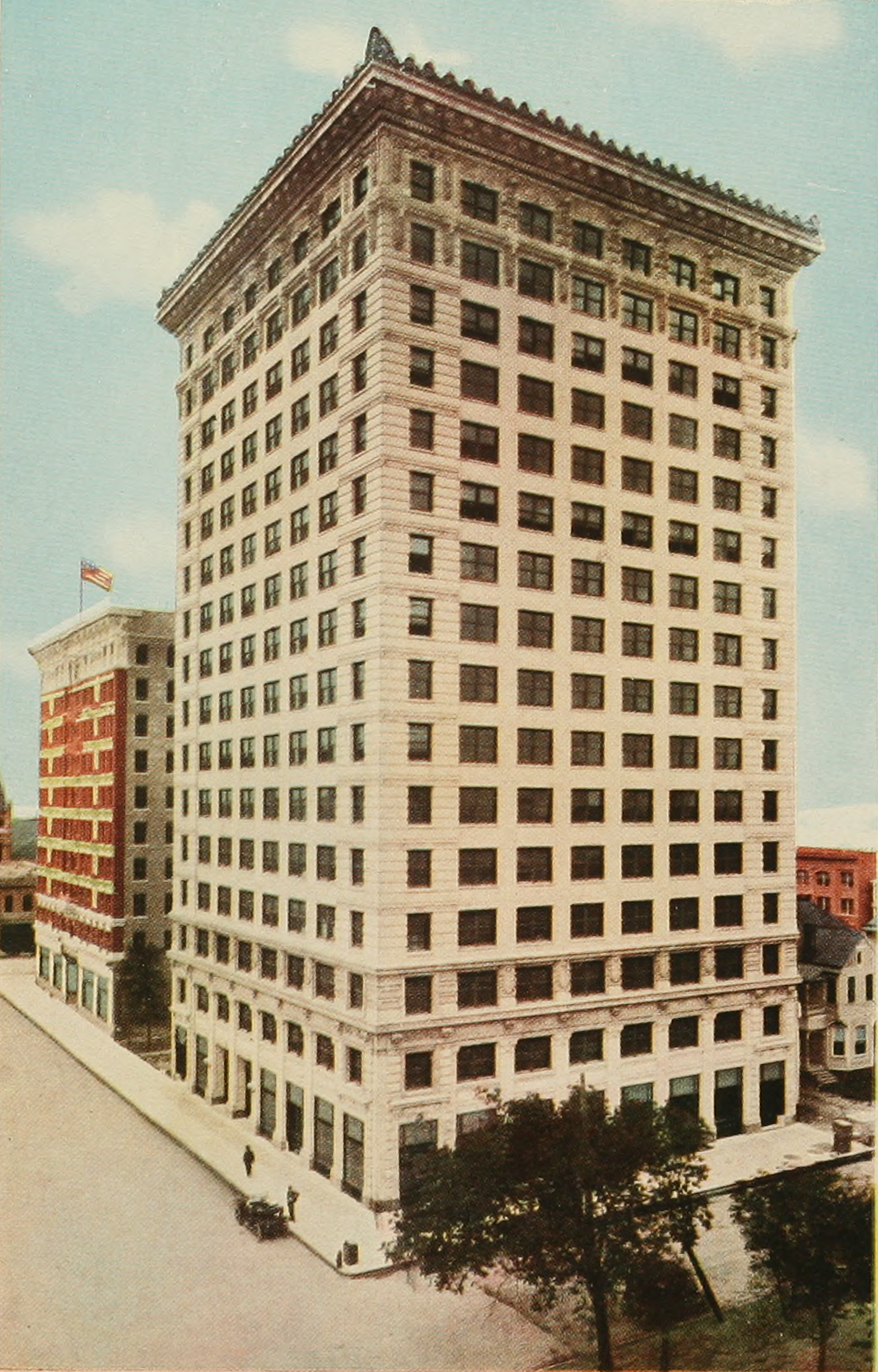
Illustration of the Carter Building The Bender Hotel shares Main Street in the background

At the time of its completion in 1910, the Carter Building was the tallest structure in Texas. Many Houstonians expressed doubt that a building so tall was structurally sound, and that a commercial building so far from Houston's business core would prosper. Many called the building "Carter's Folly."

The Carter Building was equipped with indoor plumbing and drinking fountains dispensing cold water. Interiors of all floors were decorated in Italian and Norwegian marble. Electric lights and fans were installed in each office, as well as sinks. Carter, who had founded the Lumberman's Bank in 1907, used space on the sixteenth floor for his own office, though he opted to keep the bank at its original location on Main at Prairie. Lumberman's Bank changed its name to Second National Bank in 1923. Carter sold the building in 1923 to the financial institution he founded, Second National Bank of Houston. The bank hired Boston-based architectural firm Thomas M. James Company to design a six-story addition, with assistance from Sanguinet, Staats, Hedrick, and Gottlieb. By the late 1920s, real estate development had intensified around the building and many prominent professionals were leasing office space there. John William Neal assumed the chairmanship of Second National Bank in 1929, then hired Heddrick and Gottlieb design an elaborate second-floor board room for the bank.

South Coast Life Insurance acquired the building in 1955, while Second National Bank gradually withdrew from occupancy and had completed vacated by the late 1950s. In 1969, First National Life Insurance bought the building and modernized the facings with a slipcover featuring glass and Georgian-marble panels. By 2006, some of these marble panels had been warped and replaced with plywood. In October 2009, the Second National Bank Building sold for $3 million. The purchaser, Pearl Real Estate of Fort Worth, specializes in the development, construction, and operation of hotels. At the time of purchase, forty office tenants were leasing a total 70,000 square feet, and the last of these tenants was scheduled to vacate in February 2010. The office building had 204,000 square feet of rentable space. A Christian Science Reading Room and a Domino's Pizza had been renting ground-level retail space.

== Renovation ==
Pearl Hospitality hired Gensler to design and manage the restoration of the Carter Building and its transformation into a luxury hotel. The project cost over $80 million, but the restoration is partly supported with public funding. The City of Houston loaned $7.35 million at low-interest. Houston's Downtown Redevelopment Authority provided $12 million in subsidies. Pearl Hospitality would operate the hotel branded as JW Marriott. Some of Downtown Marriott's hotel occupancy taxes will be reimbursed.

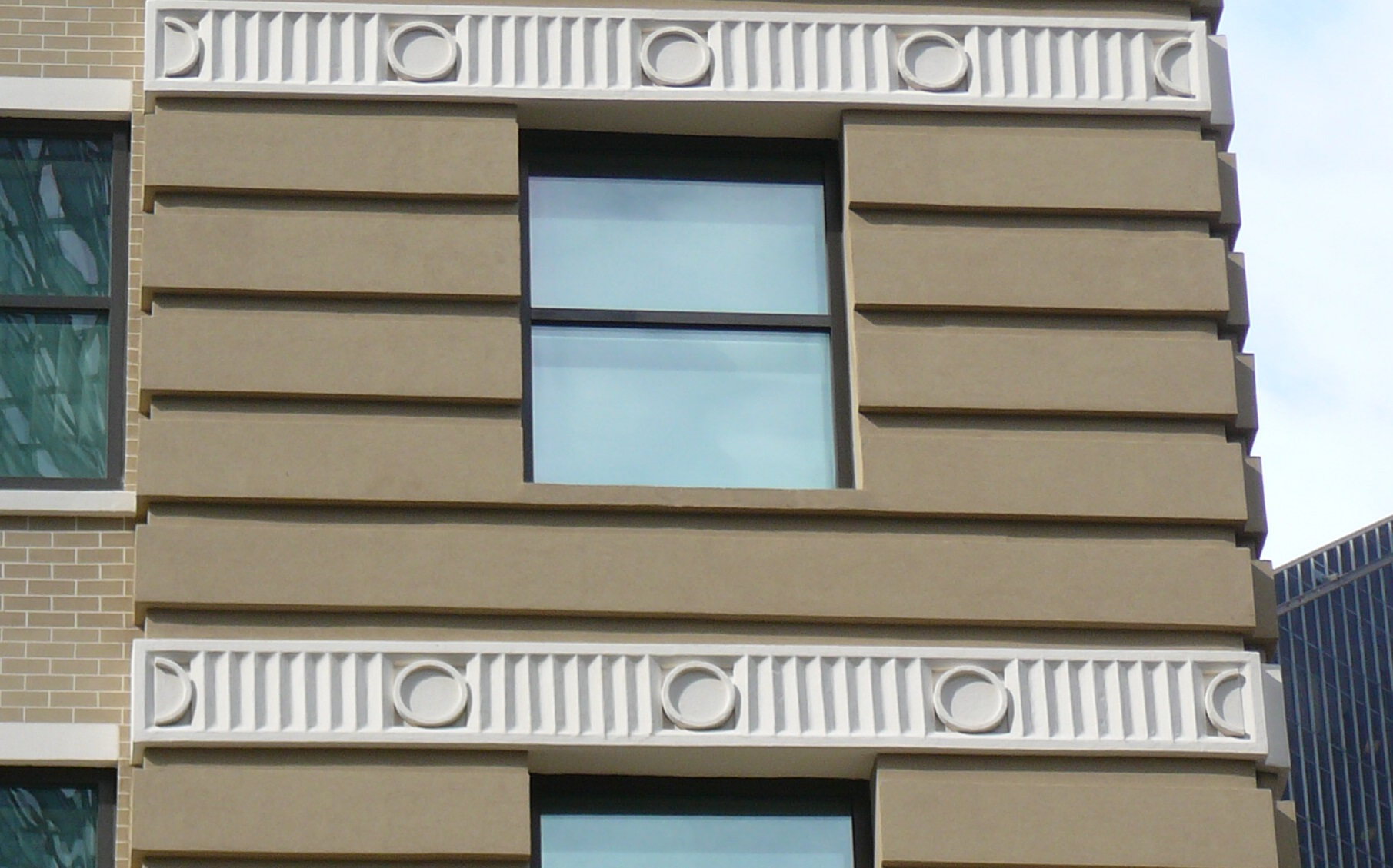
Detail of restored quoining of the Carter Building, now JW Marriott Hotel

Pearl Hospitality outlined its restoration plan in an application to the Houston Archaeological and Historical Commission. The plan included removing the 1960s glass and marble slipcover, restoration of ornaments that had been removed or had deteriorated, and removing modern aluminum window and door frames at the retail level, then replacing them with original materials.

On November 19, 2014, JW Marriott held a grand opening for its 328-room hotel at 806 Main Street, the site of the restored Carter Building. The hotel also opened with the Main Kitchen and the 806 Bar & Lounge at street level.

== Additional resources ==
- "Carter Building". Arch-ive.org.
- Jeanette H. Flachmeier, "CARTER, SAMUEL FAIN," Handbook of Texas Online (http://www.tshaonline.org/handbook/online/articles/fca73), accessed November 26, 2014. Uploaded on June 12, 2010. Published by the Texas State Historical Association.
- "Biography of Samuel Fain Carter (from American Lumberman, 1906)". Texas Transportation Archive. Original source: American Lumberman, "The Personal History and Public and Business Achievements of One Hundred Eminent Lumbermen of the United States," Second Series, American Lumberman, Chicago, 1905–1906.
- "Houston Archaeological and Historical Commission". City of Houston.
