= Majestic Theatre (Dallas) =

Performing arts theater in the City Center District of Downtown Dallas

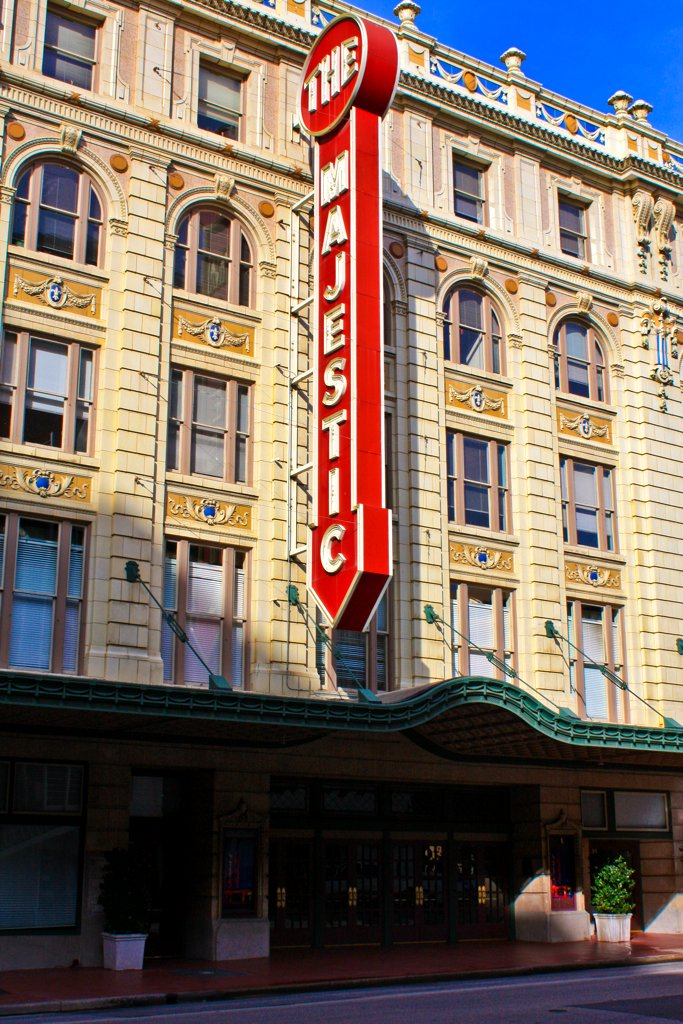
- Majestic Theatre
- Interactive map of Majestic Theatre
- Address: 1925 Elm St. Dallas, Texas; United States
- Coordinates: 32°47′1″N 96°47′40″W
- Owner: City of Dallas Office of Arts and Culture
- Operator: City of Dallas Office of Arts and Culture
- Capacity: 1,704
- Type: Theatre
- Screen: 1
- Acreage: less than one acre
- Current use: Performing Arts Center

Construction
- Built: 1921
- Opened: April 11, 1921
- Years active: 1921-1973, 1983-present
- Architect: John Eberson

Website
- The Majestic
- Majestic Theatre
- U.S. National Register of Historic Places
- U.S. Historic district – Contributing property
- Texas State Antiquities Landmark
- Recorded Texas Historic Landmark
- Dallas Landmark Dallas Landmark Historic District; Contributing Property
- Location within Texas Location within the United States
- Architectural style: Renaissance Revival
- Part of: Dallas Downtown Historic District (ID04000894)
- NRHP reference No.: 77001437
- TSAL No.: 8200000215
- RTHL No.: 6779
- DLMK No.: H/21 (individually); H/48 (Harwood HD)

Significant dates
- Added to NRHP: November 14, 1977
- Designated CP: August 11, 2006
- Designated TSAL: January 1, 1981
- Designated RTHL: 1983
- Designated DLMK: April 22, 1992 (individually); February 28, 1990 (Harwood HD)

The Majestic Theatre is a performing arts theater in the City Center District of Downtown Dallas. It is the last remnant of Theater Row, the city's historic entertainment center on Elm Street, and is a contributing property in the Harwood Street Historic District. The structure is a Dallas Landmark and is listed on the National Register of Historic Places.

== History ==
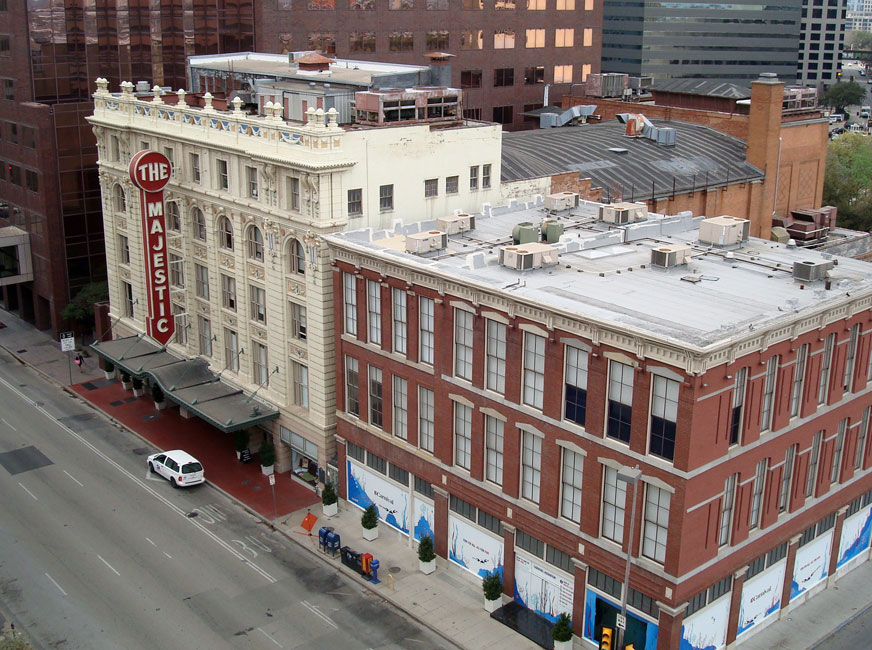
The Majestic Theatre in 2009

Designed by John Eberson under direction of Karl Hoblitzelle, the Majestic Theatre was constructed in 1920 as the flagship theater for Interstate Amusement Company, a chain of vaudeville houses. The $2 million Renaissance Revival structure opened on April 11, 1921, with a seating capacity of 2,800. It replaced a previous theater of the same name (located at Commerce Street and St. Paul Street) which burned down December 12, 1917. Operations of the Majestic were moved to the Dallas Opera House which was renamed the Majestic Theater until the new Majestic was completed.

The interior was originally divided into theater and office space, with 20,000 square feet (1,900 m^{2}) of the upper four floors used as the headquarters of the Interstate Amusement Company. The interior lobby and auditorium was of baroque design with decorative detailing consisting of Corinthian columns, egg-and-dart molding, cartouches, and Roman swags and fretwork. The lobby contained a magnificent black-and-white Italian-style Vermont marble floor and twin marble staircases. Other features included an ornate cage elevator serving the two balconies, crystal chandeliers, brass mirrors, ferns, and a marble fountain. A concession stand was added to the lobby in the late 1940s.

The auditorium featured a ceiling "sky" of floating clouds and mechanically controlled twinkling stars. Seating was provided on the main floor and in two balconies in woven cane seats. The stage was flanked by massive Corinthian columns, with an orchestra pit in front. Backstage consisted of twelve dressing rooms, a loft to accommodate scenery, and a set of wooden lighting controls. A Kilgen theater organ opus 3054 size 2/8 was also installed.

The Majestic was the grandest of all the theaters along Dallas's Theatre Row which stretched for several blocks along Elm Street. The Melba, Tower, Palace, Rialto, Capitol, Telenews (newsreels and short-subjects exclusively), Fox (live burlesque), and Strand theatres were all demolished by the late 1970s; only the Majestic remains today.

The Majestic hosted a variety of acts from Houdini to Mae West and Bob Hope during the vaudeville era. Beginning in 1922, films were added to the regular vaudeville offerings. The theatre began hosting movie premieres and associated stars such as Jimmy Stewart, Gregory Peck, and John Wayne. The Big Bands featuring Cab Calloway and Duke Ellington continued the tradition of live entertainment at the Majestic.

In 1932, the Majestic began showing movies exclusively. It was known as the "man's house" featuring films of Humphrey Bogart, James Cagney and other macho heroes while the nearby Palace was known as the "laidies' house" featuring films with female leads. On July 16, 1973, the Majestic Theatre closed after the final showing of the film “Live and Let Die”.

== Rebirth ==
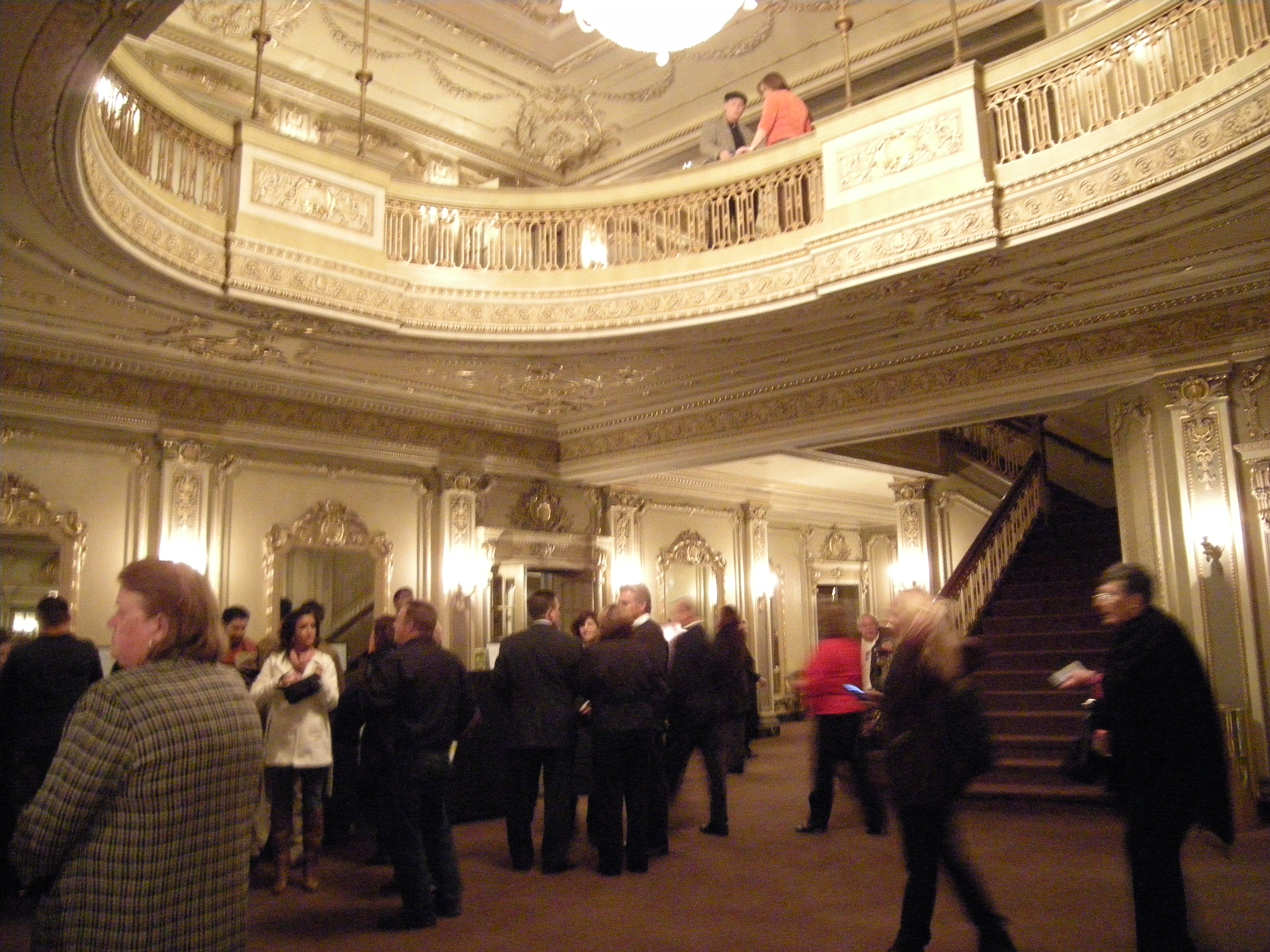
The restored lobby

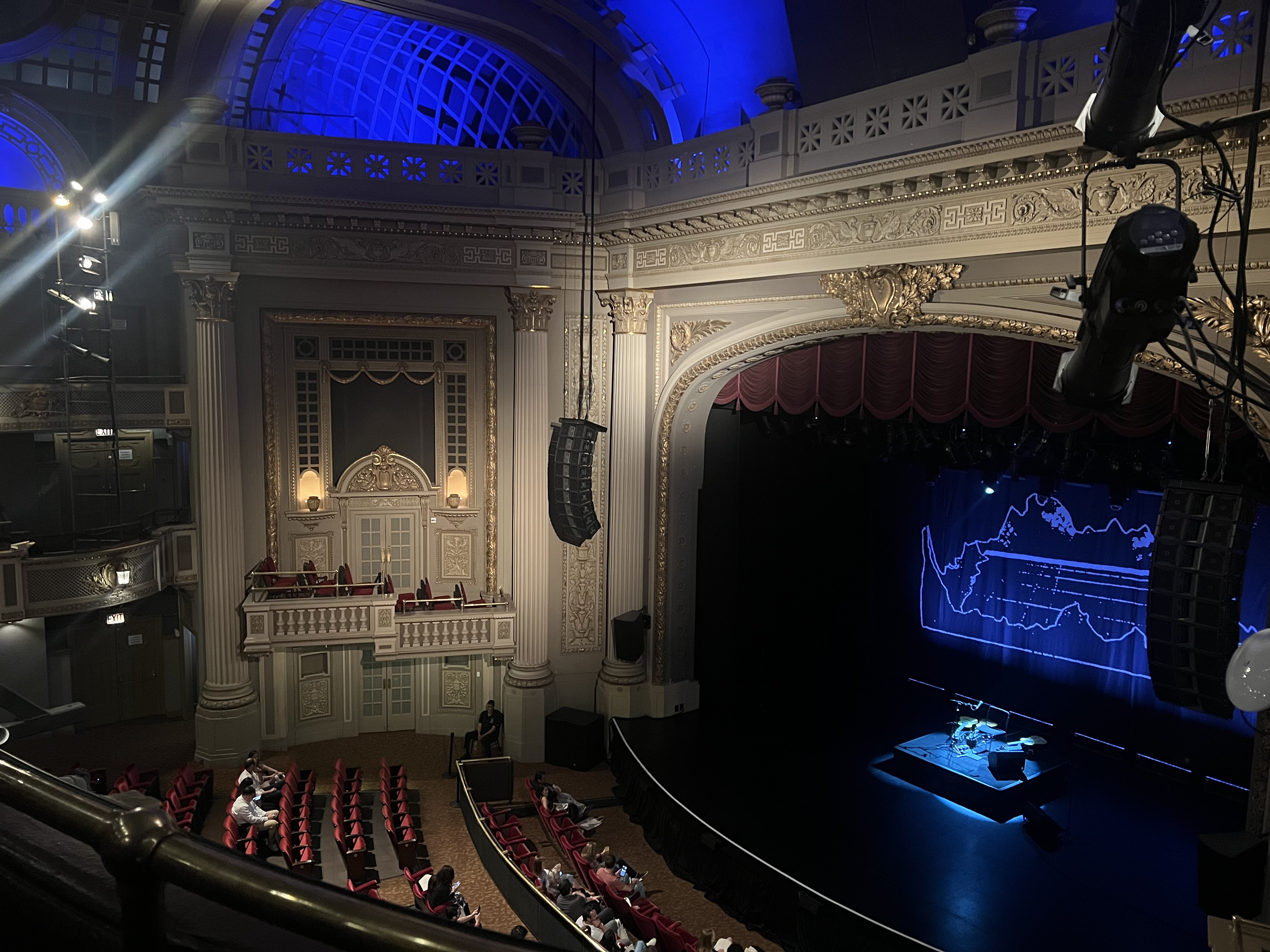
The seating and stage of the Majestic Theatre in 2024.

The Hoblitzelle Foundation turned the Majestic Theater over to the City of Dallas in January 1976 and the theatre was restored for use as a performing arts center.

After restoring the exterior, the original Corinthian columns, balustrades, urns, and trellises of the auditorium were repaired and repainted. 23K gold leaf was reapplied to the extensive interior decorative accents. New seats were installed, and the number of seats was reduced from 2,400 to 1,570, to allow for an enlarged orchestra pit, the conversion of the second balcony to house advanced sound and lighting systems, and the division of the first balcony into box seating. The stage was given a resilient floor suitable for dance performances and Backstage space was expanded.

In 1977, the Majestic Theatre became the first Dallas building to be listed on the National Register of Historic Places. It received a Texas Historical Commission marker in 1983.

The theater was reopened on January 28, 1983. Today, the Majestic is regularly used for musical productions, dramatic plays, national pageants, dance, and concerts.

== Pop culture ==
- Playwright Horton Foote, writer of the screenplay for To Kill a Mockingbird and of The Trip to Bountiful and Tender Mercies, worked at the theater as an usher for most of a year in 1932-33 when he was sixteen years old. He described it as "a movie theater that had stage shows between films."
- After closing in 1973, the theatre was used as a film location for Brian De Palma's Phantom of the Paradise (1974).
- On May 26, 1991, Barney and the Backyard Gang performed their concert here and it was released as a home video later in 1991 as Barney in Concert.
- Psalty the Singing Songbook performed and filmed his "Funtastic Praise Party" special in the theatre in 1992.

== See also ==
- National Register of Historic Places listings in Dallas County, Texas
- Recorded Texas Historic Landmarks in Dallas County
- List of Dallas Landmarks
