= Esther Walker =

American actress (1894–1943)

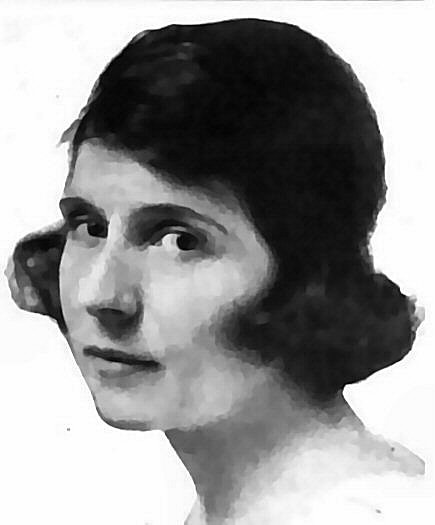
- Esther Walker, Green Book Magazine, 1919
- Born: Esther Thomas; October 18, 1894; Pewee Valley, Kentucky, U.S.
- Died: July 26, 1943 (aged 48); Dallas, Texas, U.S.
- Occupation: Singer
- Spouse: Karl Hoblitzelle

Esther Walker (nee Thomas October 18, 1894 – July 26, 1943) was an American musical comedy performer.

Esther Walker was born Esther Thomas in Pewee Valley, Kentucky. Adopting the stage name of Esther Walker, she appeared on Broadway at the Winter Garden Theatre in a 1919 production of Monte Cristo Jr., and later that year performed at the 44th Street Theatre in Hello, Alexander. Walker recorded over 32 songs for Victor and Brunswick record labels, from 1919 to 1920 and 1925 to 1927, including "Sahara (We'll Soon Be Dry Like You)" from Monte Cristo, Jr.

Walker married Texas businessman Karl Hoblitzelle, a manager of movie and vaudeville theatres. The couple founded the Hoblitzelle Foundation in 1942, which still exists today.

Walker died of cancer in Dallas, Texas, on July 26, 1943, at the age of 48.
