= South Texas National Bank (Houston) =

Historic building in Houston, Texas, U.S.

- U.S. National Register of Historic Places
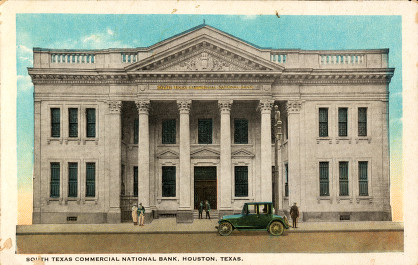

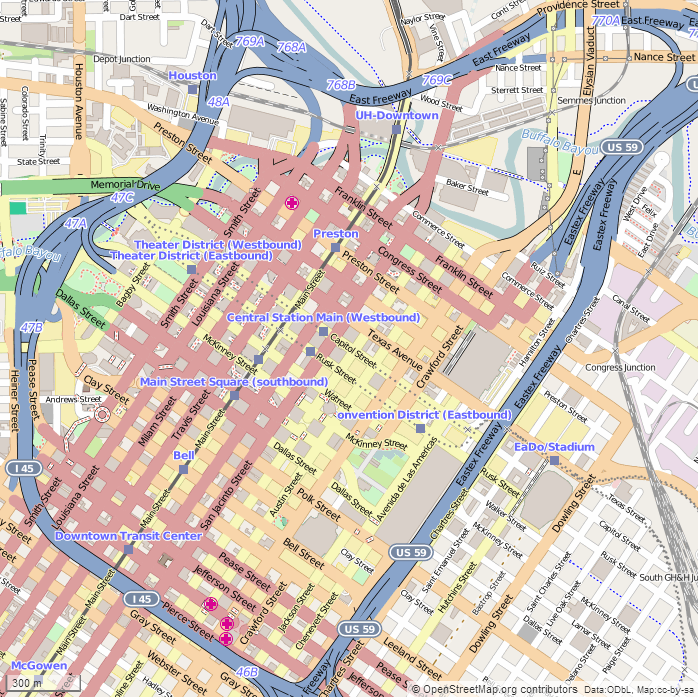
- Location within Houston Downtown Location within Texas Location within the United States
- Location: 215 Main Street, Houston, Texas
- Coordinates: 29°45′44″N 95°21′36″W
- Area: less than one acre
- Built: 1910
- Architect: C. D. Hill & Company; William Ward Watkin
- Architectural style: Classical Revival
- NRHP reference No.: 78002948
- Added to NRHP: December 8, 1978

The South Texas National Bank, located at 215 Main Street in Houston, Texas, was listed on the National Register of Historic Places on December 8, 1978. It was demolished for parking in 1983.

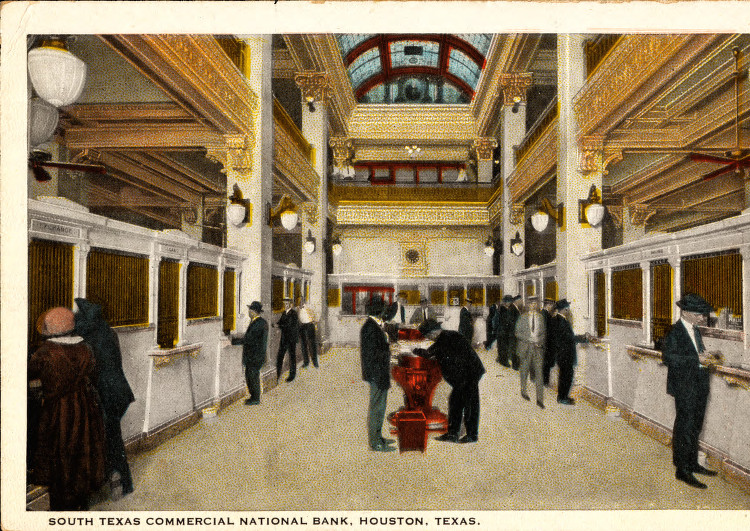
An early 20th century depiction of the bank's interior

== See also ==
- National Register of Historic Places listings in Harris County, Texas
