= First Presbyterian Church of Dallas =

First Presbyterian Church
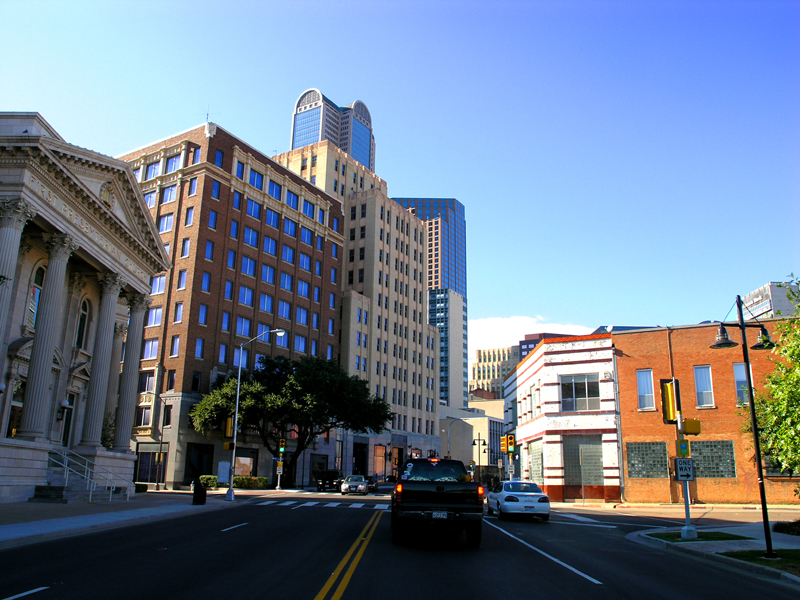
- Harwood Historic District structures including the First Presbyterian Church (far left)

- Location within Texas Location within the United States
- 32°46′46″N 96°47′37″W
- Location: 1835 Young St., Dallas, Texas
- Country: United States
- Denomination: Presbyterian Church (USA)
- Website: fpcdallas.org

Architecture
- Architect: C. D. Hill & Company
- Style: Neoclassical Revival
- Years built: 1912
- First Presbyterian Church and Activities Building
- U.S. Historic district – Contributing property
- Dallas Landmark
- Dallas Landmark Historic District; Contributing Property
- Location: 401 S. Harwood St.
- Part of: Dallas Downtown Historic District (ID08001299)
- DLMK No.: H/16
- DLMKHD No.: H/48 (Harwood HD)

Significant dates
- Designated CP: January 9, 2009
- Designated DLMK: October 21, 1981
- Designated DLMKHD: February 28, 1990

First Presbyterian Church of Dallas is a historic congregation at 1835 Young Street in the Farmers Market District of downtown Dallas, Texas, U.S. The current building is a contributing property in the Harwood Street Historic District and a Dallas Landmark. The congregation was founded in 1856 as the first U.S. (Southern) Presbyterian Church organized in Dallas, and is the mother church from which many other Presbyterian churches in the area have stemmed.

== History ==
First Presbyterian Church of Dallas was founded February 3, 1856, by the Rev. Robert Hamilton Byers, stated supply minister for Presbyterian churches in Rusk and Henderson counties. The church began with eleven members. It lacked a formal place of worship so members met at various times in private homes, a blacksmith shop, a lumber yard, the courthouse, and a printing shop.

In 1873 the congregation erected its first owned building at Elm and Ervay streets. Its second home was built in 1882 at Harwood and Main streets, the first brick church in Dallas. By 1897 this structure had been enlarged and so extensively remodeled that it was considered to be a new (third) building. The style was Victorian eclectic.

The present sanctuary and Harwood Street Educational Building at Harwood and Wood, the congregation's fourth home, were built in 1911–12 by the Alex Watson Construction Company and opened on March 2, 1913. The Greek Revival church edifice was designed by C. D. Hill & Company, a prominent Dallas architecture firm. The Corinthian columns that flank the entrance doors on Harwood and Wood Streets are monolithic—the first in Dallas. Each column was shipped to Dallas on a separate flatcar from Indiana.

The exterior walls contain the original pictorial windows of "art glass". These were prepared by the Kansas City Stained Glass Works Company and shipped to Dallas in 1912. The interior design is a modified Akron Plan. The Akron plan was developed by Akron, Ohio architects (1900–1920) to promote efficiency of movement by congregants between worship and Sunday School. This plan is characterized by a semicircular amphitheater with curved seating, opening to classrooms immediately adjacent to the Sanctuary.

The current minister is Rev. Amos J. Disasa.

== Community involvement ==
Since its early days First Presbyterian has been providing social services in Dallas.

- First Presbyterian Church began a home to house the city's orphaned and abandoned children at Annex and Bryan Streets. Today a state historical marker stands at the entrance to the Presbyterian Children's Home and Service Agency in Itasca, Texas, tracing the institution's roots to this Dallas church.
- Children's Medical Center, adjacent to the University of Texas Southwestern Medical School in Dallas, had its beginning as a clinic for small children in the basement of First Presbyterian Church in 1921. It was the first free clinic in the Southwest.
- The congregation began its Stewpot ministry to the homeless and disadvantaged in 1975. The Stewpot and its many related ministries have received national recognition and serve as models for other churches/cities. In May 2008, First Presbyterian entered into an agreement with the city of Dallas and the Metro Dallas Homeless Alliance to move the Stewpot's meal service to The Bridge, Dallas' new homeless assistance center, where they now serve 3 meals a day, 7 days a week.

== See also ==
- National Register of Historic Places listings in Dallas County, Texas
- List of Dallas Landmarks
