= Stanley Patterson Hall =

- U.S. National Register of Historic Places
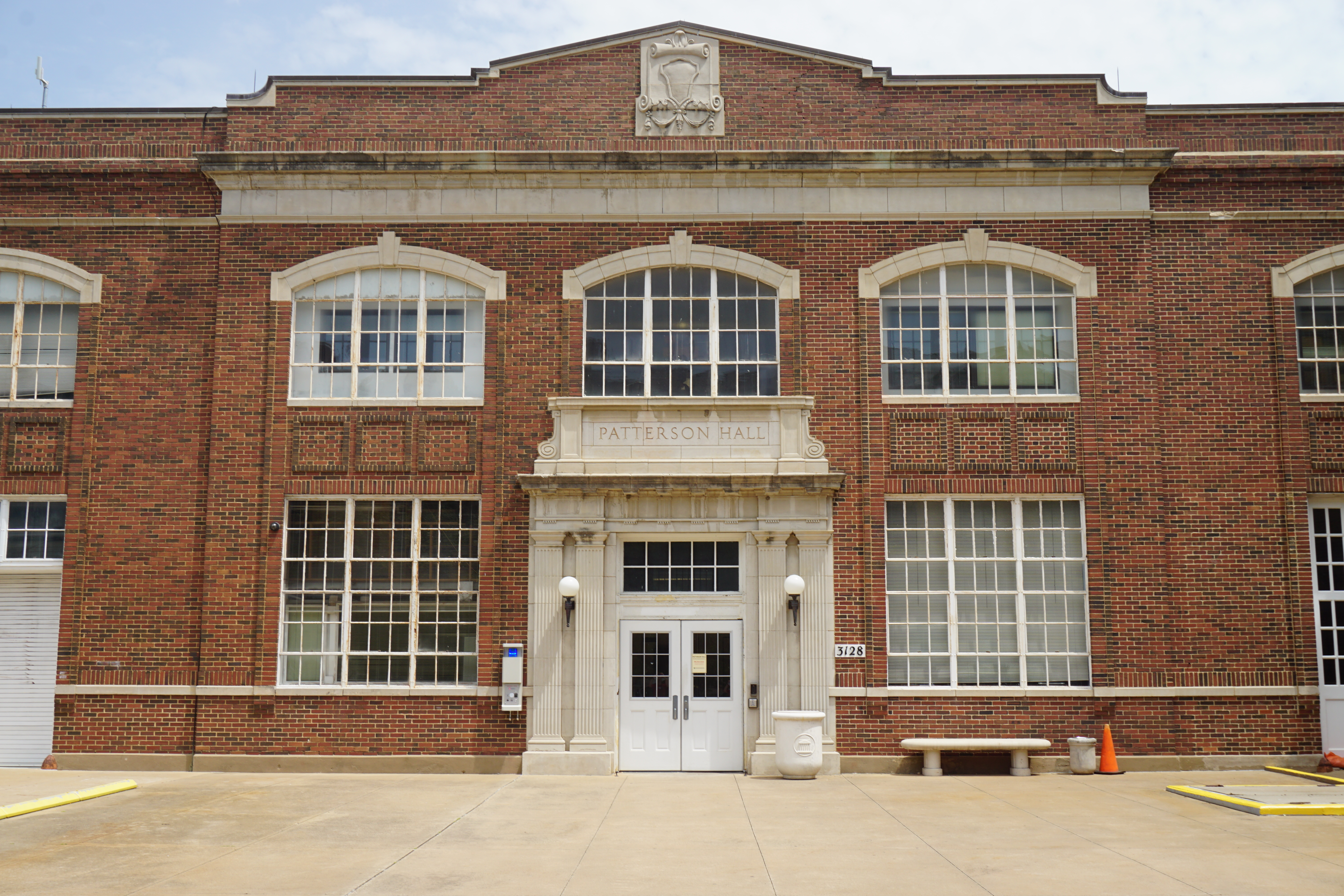
- Patterson Hall in 2016

- Location within Texas Location within the United States
- Location: 3128 Dyer St., University Park, Texas
- Coordinates: 32°50′36″N 96°46′56″W
- Area: less than one acre
- Built: 1928
- Architect: Coburn & Smith
- Architectural style: Colonial Revival, Georgian Revival
- MPS: Georgian Revival Buildings of Southern Methodist University TR (AD)
- NRHP reference No.: 80004094
- Added to NRHP: September 27, 1980

Stanley Patterson Hall is a historic building on the campus of Southern Methodist University in University Park, Texas. It was built in 1928, and designed by Coburn & Smith in the Georgian Revival architectural style. It has been listed on the National Register of Historic Places since September 27, 1980.

== See also ==
- National Register of Historic Places listings in Dallas County, Texas
