= Karl Hoblitzelle =

American philanthropist and real estate inventor (1879–1967)

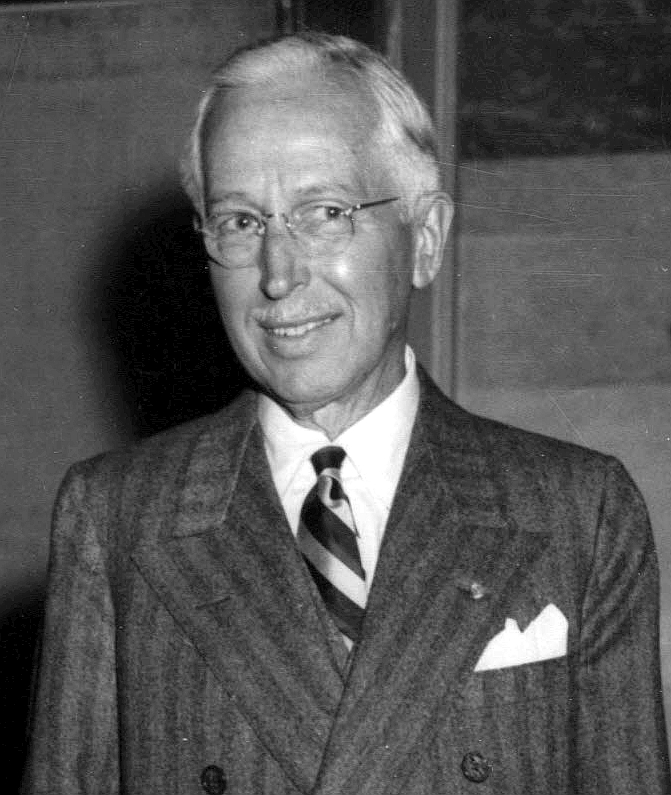
- Hoblitzelle in 1952
- Born: October 22, 1879; St. Louis, Missouri, U.S.
- Died: March 8, 1967 (aged 87); Dallas, Texas, U.S.
- Resting place: Bellefontaine Cemetery, St. Louis, Missouri, U.S.
- Occupations: Theater owner, philanthropist
- Spouse: Esther Walker
- Relatives: Samuel Ogle (paternal great-grandfather)

Karl Hoblitzelle (October 22, 1879 – March 8, 1967) was an American theater owner, real estate investor, and philanthropist. He was the co-founder of the Interstate Theaters Company, a chain of vaudeville theaters (later movie theaters), now a subsidiary of The Walt Disney Company. He was the first theater owner to add air conditioning to movie theaters in the United States, and the first to add sound in the Southwest. He also helped support the construction of the University of Texas Southwestern Medical Center.

== Early life ==
Karl Hoblitzelle was born on October 22, 1879, in St. Louis, Missouri. His father, Clarence Linden Hoblitzelle, was a veteran of the Confederate States Army during the American Civil War. His mother was Ida Adelaide Knapp. His maternal grandfather, Colonel George Knapp, was the founder of the Missouri Gazette, later known as the Missouri Republican and finally the St. Louis Globe-Democrat. He eventually had nine brothers and three sisters.

Hoblitzelle was of Swiss, Austrian and English descent on his paternal side and of Irish, English and French descent on his maternal side. His ancestors were settlers who fought in the American Revolutionary War. His paternal great-grandfather, Samuel Ogle was the Governor of Maryland.

Hoblitzelle graduated from high school in St. Louis, but his parents could not afford to send him to college.

== Career ==
Hoblitzelle began his career working in real estate for his uncle; he worked in a soap factory, and later sold vegetables grown on his family farm as a market trader. He subsequently worked at the Louisiana Purchase Exposition of 1904.

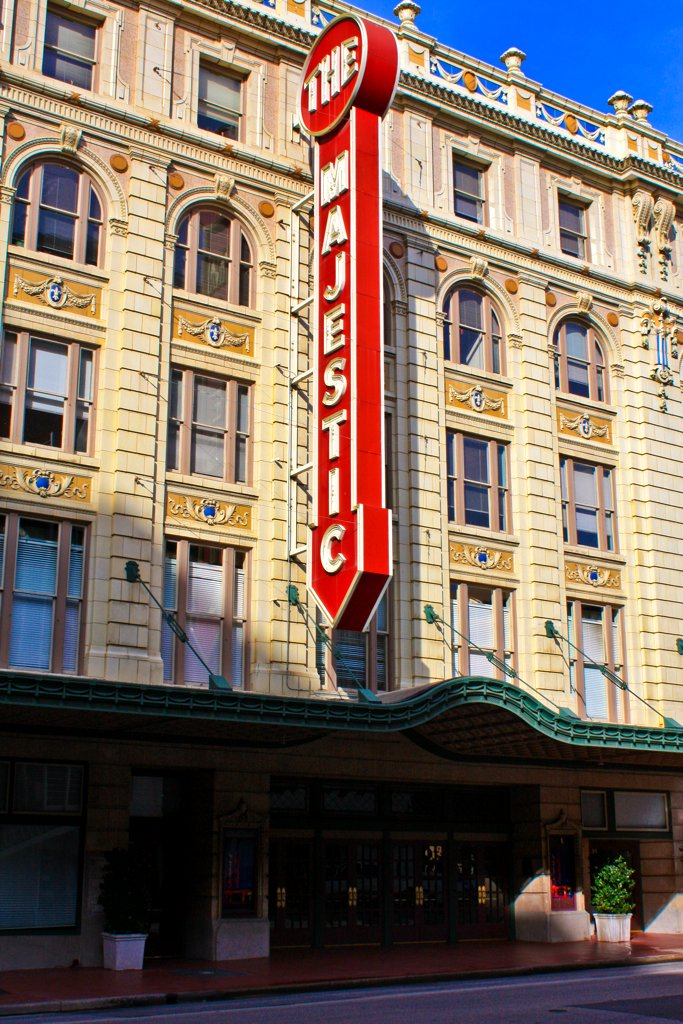
The Majestic Theater in Dallas, Texas

Hoblitzelle met Edward McMechin, a businessman who suggested he invest in vaudeville theaters, in 1904. By 1905, Hoblitzelle and his brother George K. co-founded the Interstate Theaters Company. The company operated vaudeville theaters in Texas, although it was headquartered in Missouri. It later became a chain of movie theaters. One of them was the Majestic Theatre in Dallas; another was the Majestic Theatre in San Antonio. More theaters were opened in Fort Worth, Waco and Houston as well as Shreveport, Louisiana, Birmingham, Alabama, Little Rock, Arkansas, and Wichita, Kansas.

Hoblitzelle sold the company to RKO Pictures in 1930; however, he purchased it again in 1933. During World War II, Hoblitzelle worked with the United States Army to show patriotic films in his theaters. In 1951, Hoblitzelle sold the company to United Paramount (later known as American Broadcasting-Paramount Theatres, followed by Capital Cities/ABC Inc., now a subsidiary of The Walt Disney Company). However, he "retained management rights in 165 theaters". Hoblitzelle was the first to add sound to movie theaters in the Southwest (1930), and the first in the United States to add air conditioning (1922).

Hoblitzelle was also the chairman of Hoblitzelle Properties, a real estate conglomerate, and the Republic National Bank.

== Philanthropy and civic activities ==
Hoblitzelle founded the Hoblitzelle Foundation in 1942. He was the founder of the Texas Heritage Foundation, a non-profit organization for the promotion of Texan culture. He also served on the boards of the Dallas Art Association, the Dallas Symphony Society, and the Dallas Grand Opera Association. Additionally, he co-founded the Southwestern Medical Foundation, which supported the construction of the University of Texas Southwestern Medical Center in Dallas.

Hoblitzelle was the chairman of the Hockaday School, a private academy in Dallas. He also served on the executive committee of Southern Methodist University in Dallas, on the board of directors of Texas Tech University in Lubbock, and on the board of trustees of Texas A&M University in College Station. He also made charitable contributions to the University of Texas.

== Personal life and death ==
Hoblitzelle married Esther Thomas, later known as Esther Walker, a singer who predeceased him in 1943. They resided in Dallas, Texas.

Hoblitzelle died on March 8, 1967, in Dallas. His funeral was held at the Park Cities Baptist Church, and he was buried in the Bellefontaine Cemetery in St. Louis. By the time of his death, he was worth an estimated $17 million. His estate went to the Hoblitzelle Foundation.
