= Oak Lawn Methodist Episcopal Church, South =

Historic church in Texas, United States

- U.S. National Register of Historic Places
- Dallas Landmark
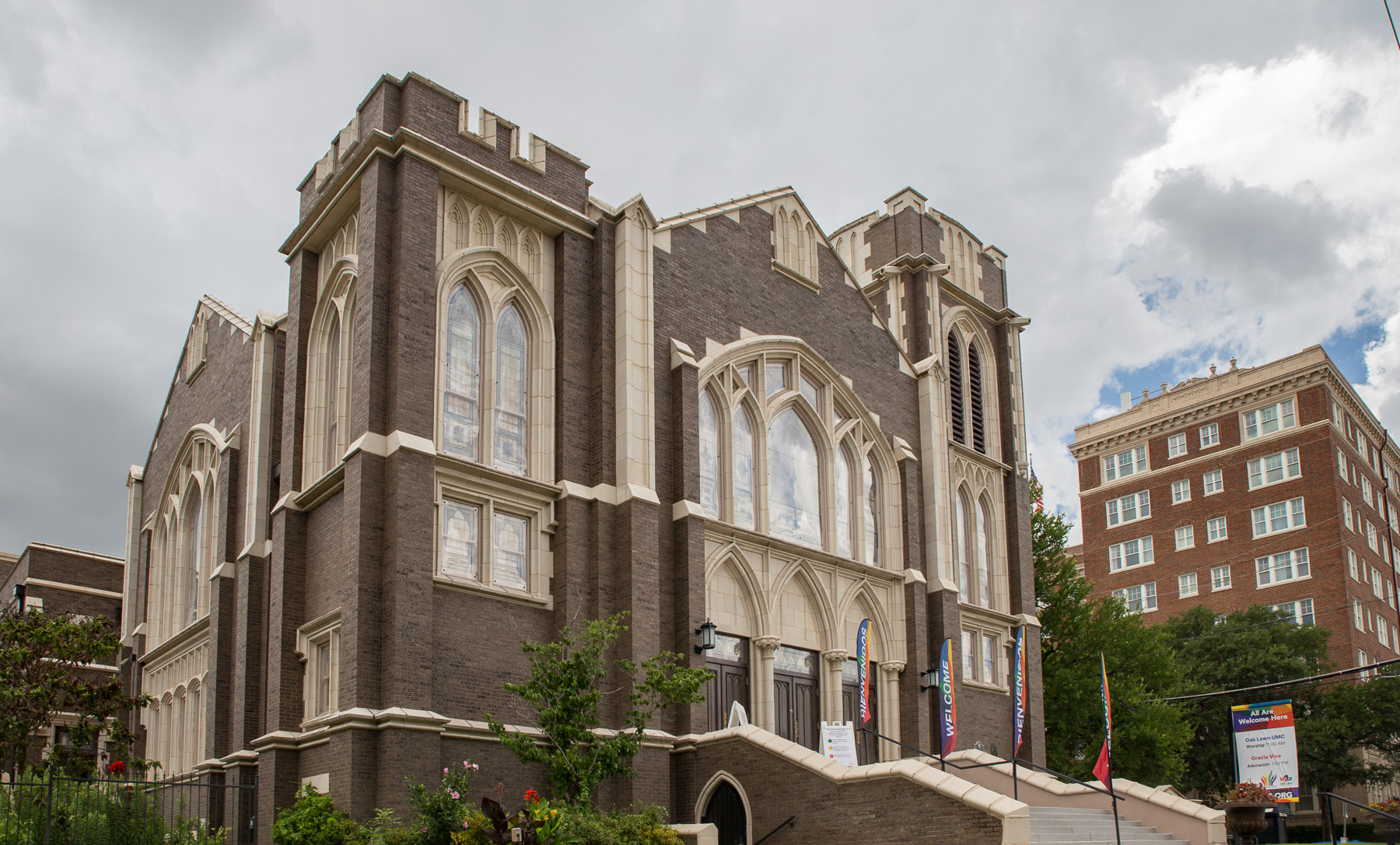
- Oak Lawn Methodist in 2021

- Location within Texas Location within the United States
- Location: 3014 Oak Lawn Ave., Dallas, Texas
- Coordinates: 32°48′33″N 96°48′29″W
- Area: less than one acre
- Built: 1911
- Architect: C. D. Hill & Company; Coburn & Fowler
- Architectural style: Late Gothic Revival
- Website: Oak Lawn United Methodist Church
- NRHP reference No.: 88000176
- DLMK No.: H/27

Significant dates
- Added to NRHP: March 16, 1988
- Designated DLMK: August 15, 1984

Oak Lawn Methodist Episcopal Church, South (now known as Oak Lawn United Methodist Church) is a historic United Methodist church at 3014 Oak Lawn Avenue in Dallas, Texas.

The late Gothic Revival church building began construction in 1911 and was completed in 1915. It was added to the National Register of Historic Places in 1988.

== See also ==
- National Register of Historic Places listings in Dallas County, Texas
- List of Dallas Landmarks
