= Hyer Hall =

- U.S. National Register of Historic Places
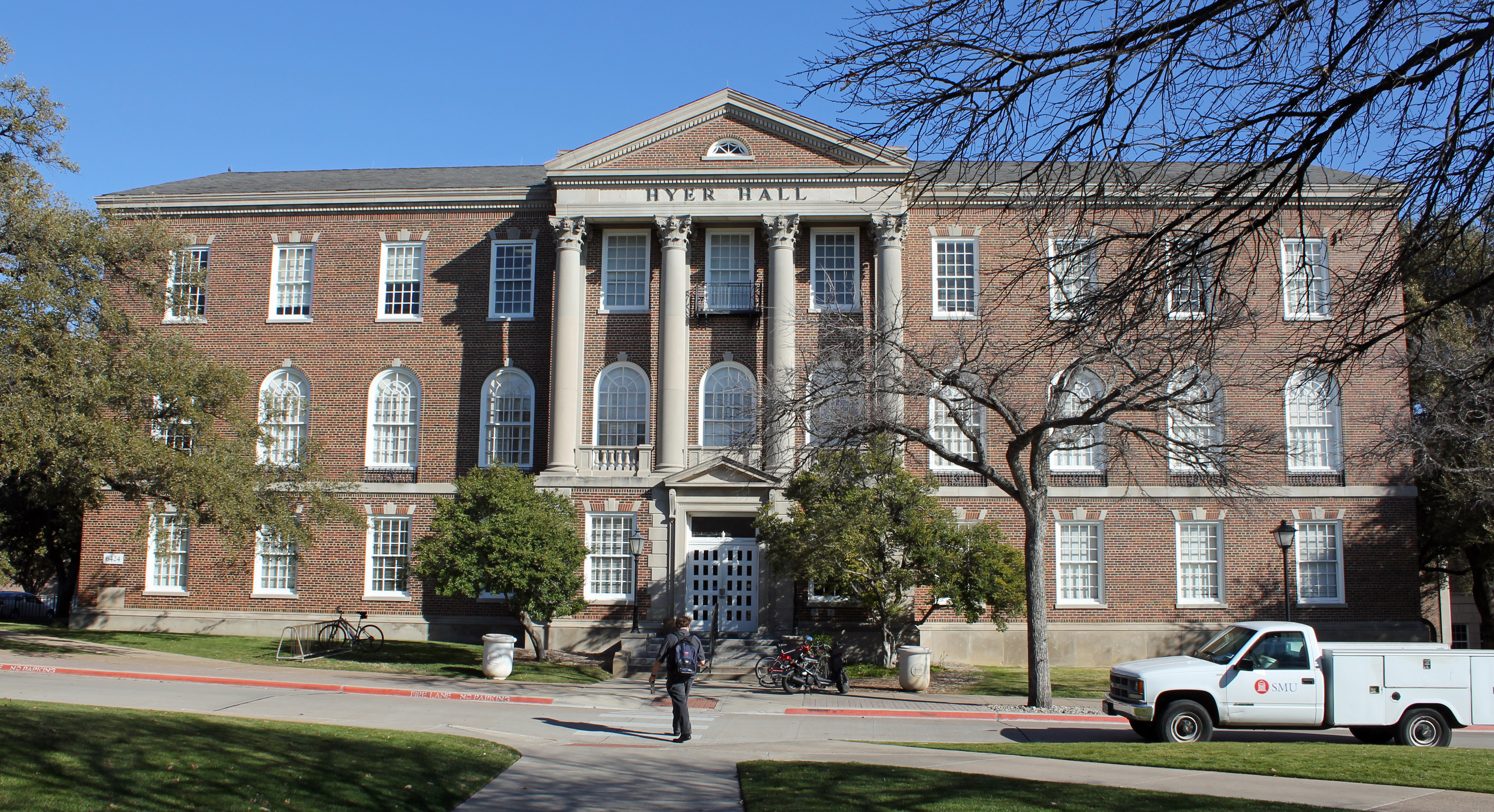
- Hyer Hall in 2012

- Location within Texas Location within the United States
- Location: 6424 Robert S. Hyer Ln., University Park, Texas
- Coordinates: 32°50′41″N 96°47′2″W
- Area: less than one acre
- Built: 1927
- Architect: C. D. Hill & Company
- Architectural style: Colonial Revival, Georgian Revival
- MPS: Georgian Revival Buildings of Southern Methodist University TR (AD)
- NRHP reference No.: 80004090
- Added to NRHP: September 27, 1980

Hyer Hall is a historic building on the campus of Southern Methodist University in University Park, Texas, U.S.. It was built in 1927, and designed by C. D. Hill & Company in the Georgian Revival architectural style. It was named in honor of Robert Stewart Hyer, SMU's first president. It has been listed on the National Register of Historic Places since September 27, 1980.

== See also ==
- National Register of Historic Places listings in Dallas County, Texas
