= Davis Building (Dallas, Texas) =

- 1926 Republic National Bank
- U.S. National Register of Historic Places
- U.S. Historic district – Contributing property
- Dallas Landmark
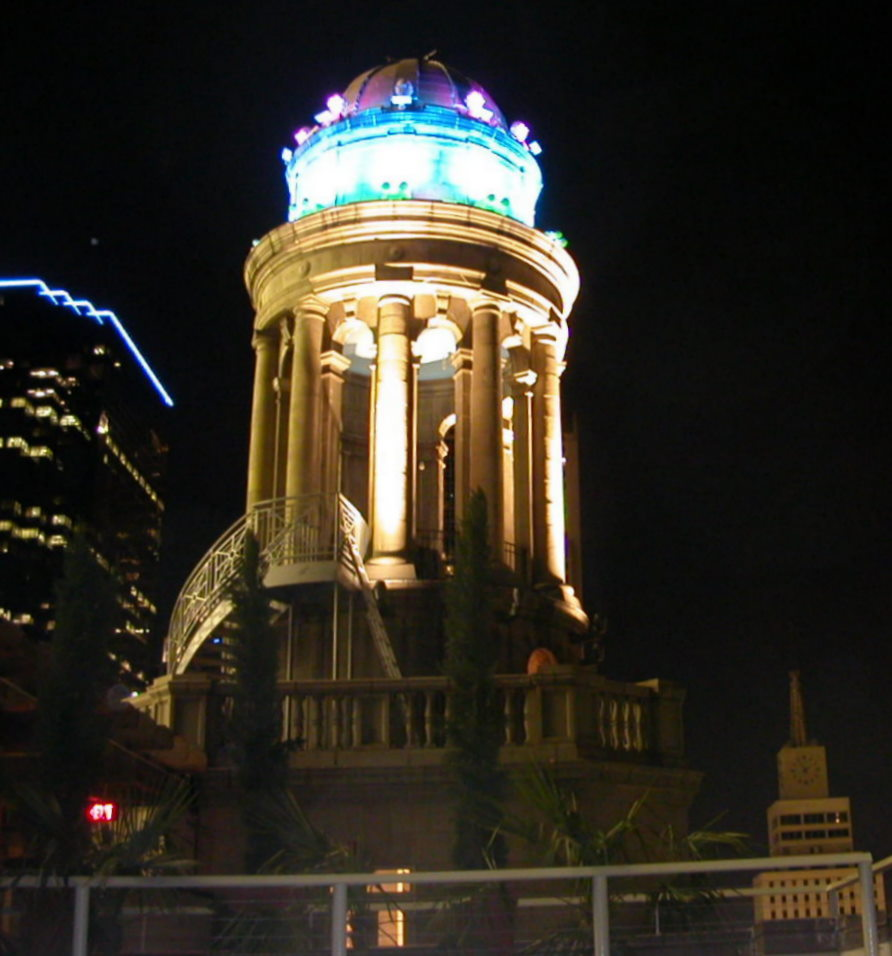
- 1926 Republic Bank building in 2003

- Location within Texas Location within the United States
- Location: 1309 Main St., Dallas, Texas
- Coordinates: 32°46′56″N 96°48′3″W
- Area: less than one acre
- Built: 1926
- Built by: The Beck Group
- Architects: C. D. Hill & Company; Coburn & Fowler
- Architectural style: Skyscraper
- Website: The Drakestone
- Part of: Dallas Downtown Historic District (ID04000894)
- NRHP reference No.: 05001543
- DLMK No.: H/87

Significant dates
- Added to NRHP: January 18, 2006
- Designated CP: August 11, 2006
- Designated DLMK: June 10, 1998

The Drakestone (previously Davis Building) is a 20-story high-rise in downtown Dallas. The building rises to a height of 323 feet (98 m).

== History ==
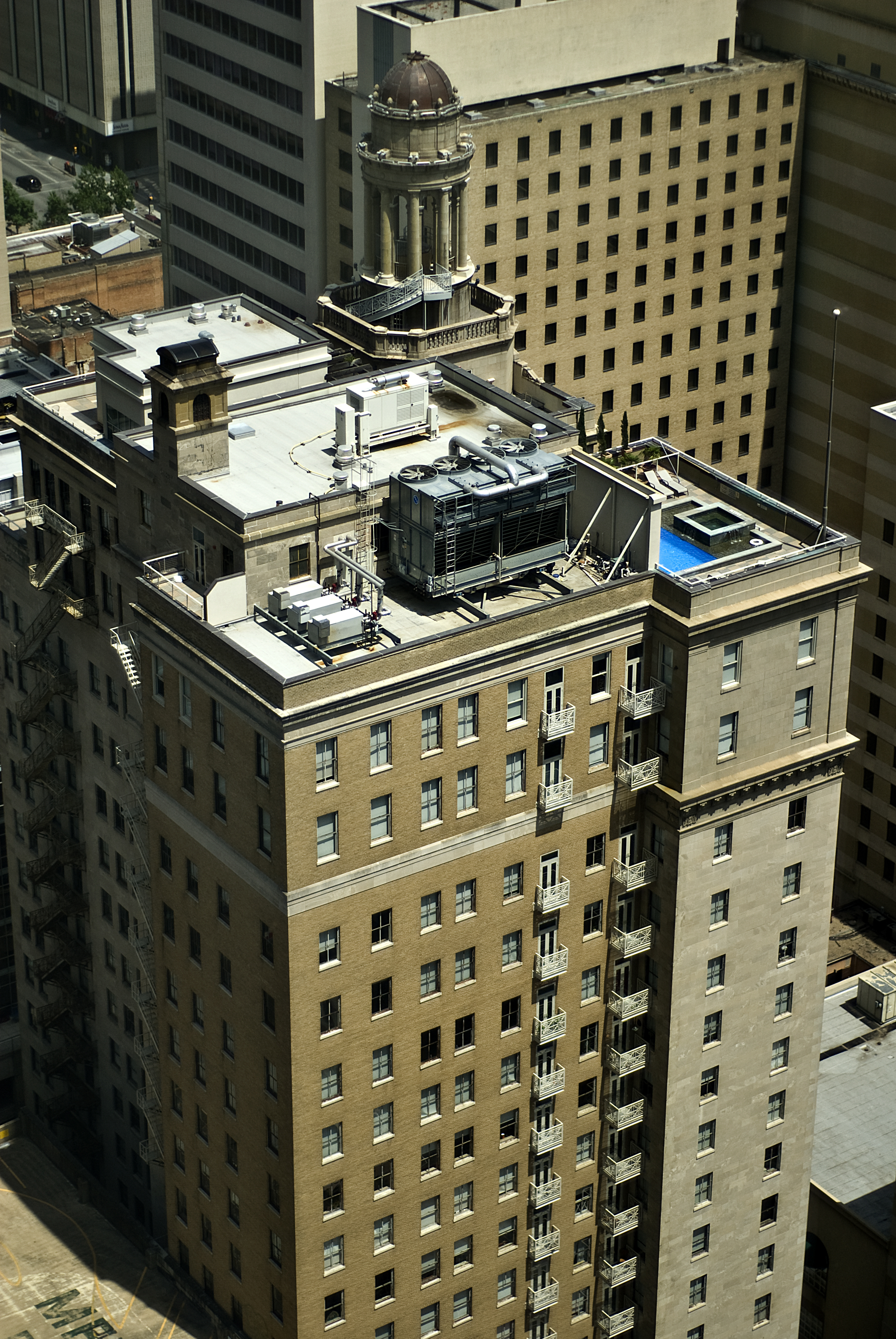

In 1925 Republic National Bank was ready to open its doors. On February 15, 1926, Republic National Bank held its first open house. Charles D. Hill was never able to see his creation due to his death in early January 1926. Then in 1954 the bank had outgrown its space and was moved to the Republic National Bank Building at 300 North Ervay Street. Republic National Bank vacated its premises in December 1954. In June 1954, the 1309 Main St. Building was renamed after being purchased by longtime chairman Wirt Davis, Percy Davis, Charles Sammons, and H. Harrison. In January 1967, plans for major renovation of The Davis Building announced to "modernization" of interiors and to convert the first four levels into and air-conditioned mall, and further expansion of the tunnel to connect with One Main Place and The Renaissance Tower.Plans never completely carried through to complete modernization. In August 1986 lenders post The Davis Building in foreclosure for funds equaling $18.5 million. In 1991 the building was used in part of the set for the movie Touch and Die featuring Martin Sheen. Hamilton Properties then purchased the building in 1997 with plans for renovation into apartment lofts. In March 2002, construction loans finalized and new construction commenced. The cupola was lit up for the first time in 2003 since 1954, and first occupancy was available. The newly designed 183 unit lofts in The Davis Building proved to be the only successful renovation for the building.

In May 2011, The Davis Building was purchased by The Bascom Group.

The Drakestone (previously Davis Building) is a Dallas Landmark and was listed on the National Register of Historic Places in 2006.

== See also ==
- National Register of Historic Places listings in Dallas County, Texas
- List of Dallas Landmarks
