= The Joule Hotel =

- Dallas National Bank
- U.S. National Register of Historic Places
- U.S. Historic district – Contributing property
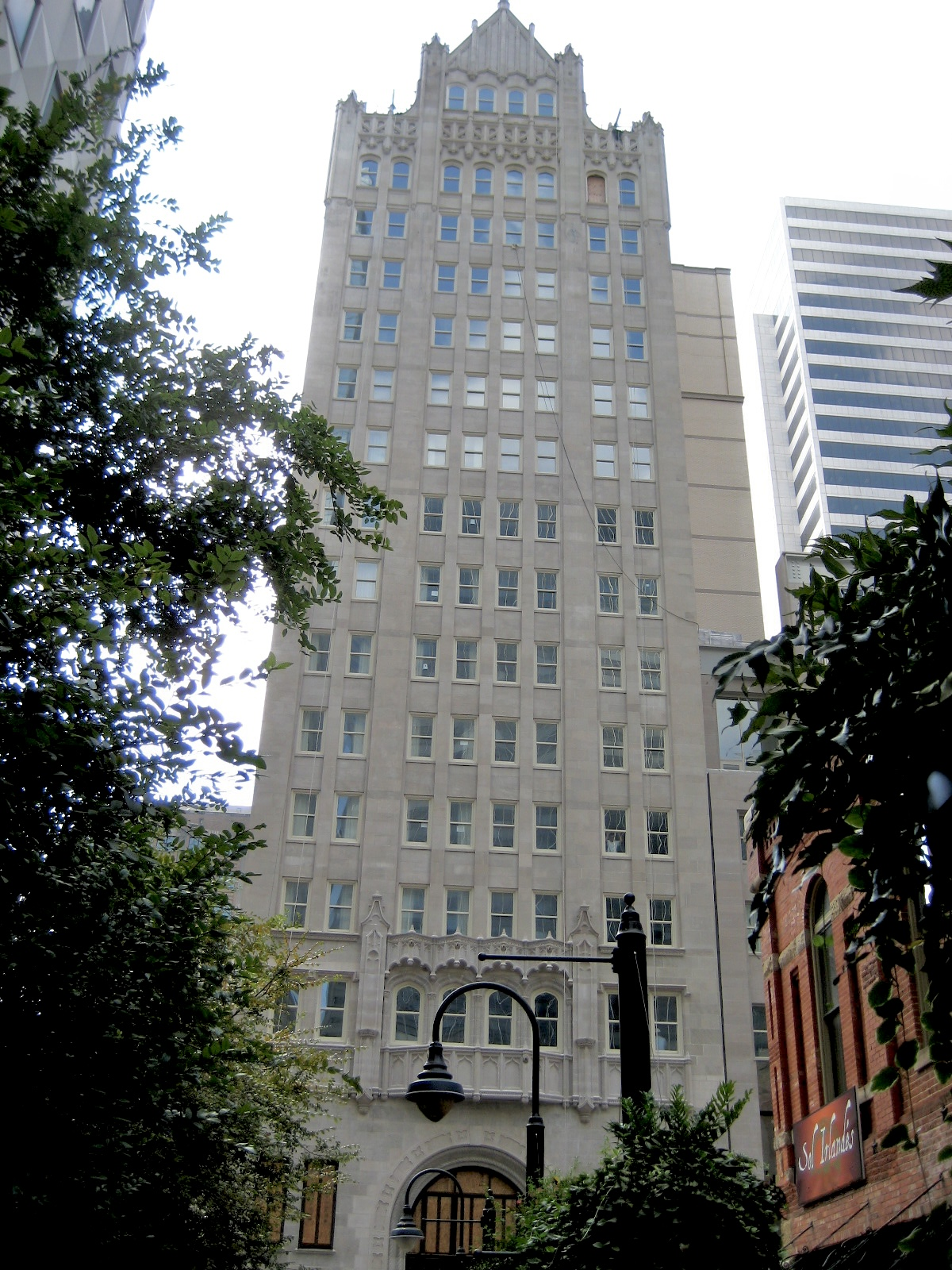
- Dallas National Bank building in 2007

- Location within Texas Location within the United States
- Location: 1530 Main and 1511 Commerce St., Dallas, Texas
- Coordinates: 32°46′56″N 96°47′54″W
- Area: less than one acre
- Built: 1927
- Built by: Hexter & Chambers
- Architect: Coburn, Smith & Evans
- Architectural style: Gothic Revival, Skyscraper
- Website: The Joule
- Part of: Dallas Downtown Historic District (ID04000894)
- NRHP reference No.: 05000419

Significant dates
- Added to NRHP: May 10, 2005
- Designated CP: August 11, 2006

The Joule Hotel is a four-star, 160-room hotel developed by Headington Hotels, owned by Timothy Headington. Located at 1530 Main Street, between Akard Street and Ervay Street, the building was constructed in 1927 as the Dallas National Bank Building, and was known later as the SPG Building. At the end of Stone Street Plaza, it is in the Main Street District of downtown Dallas, Texas, and with the Kirby Building, one of two Gothic high-rises in the city.

Its 10th floor pool cantilevers eight feet over the easement below, and was designed by ARCHITEXAS (Architecture, Planning and Historic Preservation, Inc). The interior was designed by Adam Tihany, and the lobby level is home to the Americano and CBD Provisions restaurants in addition to Weekend Coffee. Cocktail bar Midnight Rambler occupies the basement and features decor based on the bar from Stanley Kubrick's The Shining and David Lynch's Silencio Club.

From 2005 through 2007, evidence of a fire was discovered during ongoing renovations of the building next to the Joule. According to pictures available at the Dallas Public Library, in 1951, a significant fire occurred at the National Shirt Shop and Manuel's Cleaners, former businesses directly to the East of the Dallas National Bank building.

== Gallery ==
Facing Main Street with The Merc in background

Cantilevered swimming pool

== See also ==
- National Register of Historic Places listings in Dallas County, Texas
