= Central Presbyterian Church (Waxahachie, Texas) =

Historic church in Texas, United States

- U.S. National Register of Historic Places
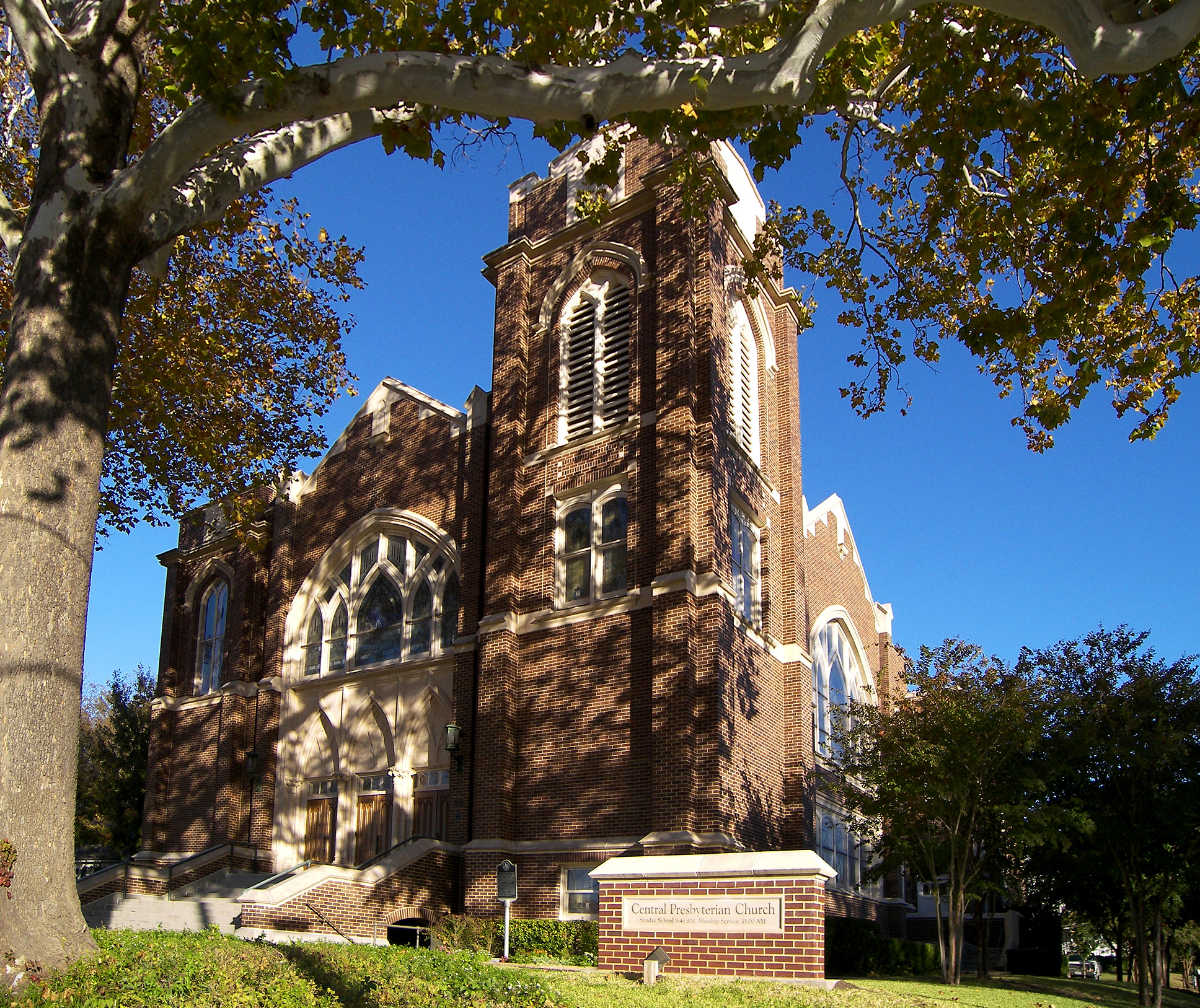
- Central Presbyterian Church in 2008

- Location within Texas Location within the United States
- Location: 402 N. College, Waxahachie, Texas
- Coordinates: 32°23′20″N 96°50′40″W
- Area: less than one acre
- Built: 1917
- Architect: C. D. Hill & Company
- Architectural style: Late Gothic Revival
- MPS: Waxahachie MRA
- NRHP reference No.: 86002362
- Added to NRHP: September 11, 1987

Central Presbyterian Church (CPC) is a historic church at 402 N. College in Waxahachie, Texas.

== About ==
Each of the 250+ members is from varied denominational backgrounds, united together for the glory of God and the love of Christ that surpasses all knowledge. Central Presbyterian has a youth group and strong ties to Presbyterian Children’s Homes and Services. It is an established church in a historic community. CPC is part of Grace Presbytery and Presbyterian Church (USA).

== Mission ==
Worship. Love. Grow. Act.

=== Responding to God’s grace ===
"Inspired by the grace of God we nurture and enrich the spiritual faith of our church community and exemplify God’s transcending love in our daily lives through our worship, witness and actions so all will come to know and embrace the redeeming power of our Lord and Savior, Jesus Christ! Together, we are the body of Christ. The power of the mission statement lies in the application to the vision, ministries, and day to day activities of this church and by each individual through the Holy Spirit."

=== Worship ===
Every Sunday at 11 AM

402 N. College St Waxahachie, Tx 75165

Beginning

Central Presbyterian Church was founded in 1853 when the Reverend B. Malloy organized the Cumberland Presbyterian Church, with twelve charter members. With the union of two national Presbyterian denominations in 1905, the local congregation took the name of Central Presbyterian Church of Waxahachie, Texas.

The Current Building

The current building was first used on Easter of 1919. Designed by architect C.D. Hill, this late Gothic Revival building was constructed of oriental brick trimmed in white stone, with a seating capacity of approximately five hundred. The cost of the building and furnishings was $112,522. The pipe organ, which is an Austin Opus 809, and is still in operation, was donated.

=== “Today we became a church” ===
In 1950, CPC sponsored a refugee family from post WWII Communist-ruled Hungary, the Zsohars. With two days' notice, the congregation responded and got a house ready for the family. Ed Clark, head of the Men’s Bible class, said as he addressed the congregation, “Today, we became a church!” The relationship established with the Zsohar family has had a long-lasting impact on CPC’s mission of reaching out to others beyond our walls and into the world. Surviving Through Faith, written by Zoltan Zsohar, chronicles how God used the members of CPC in 1950 to respond to the family’s needs, welcome them to their new home in Texas and to unite a church.

=== Commitment to youth ===
The Presbyterian Children’s Homes and Services (PCHAS) began its mission in Waxahachie during September 1960. The organization provides Christ-centered care and family support to children from birth to 17-years–old, as well as single mothers who have suffered from neglect, abuse, and abandonment, or children whose families are experiencing some type of family crisis or other issues which threaten family stability. Over the years, many members have served as mentors to the kids. The kids and home parents are an integral part of the church family, and the deep commitment to PCHAS continues today.

The youth group, Same Difference Youth Group, has a strong tradition of fellowship with each other and connecting with other Presbyterian youth through camps at Mo Ranch and the annual Senior High Youth Conference within Grace Presbytery. The Youth have also been leaders in service, volunteering at Our Calling, Union Gospel Mission, as well as mission trips within Texas in recent years.

=== "Bethlehem Revisted" ===
In 1997, Central Presbyterian Church initiated “Bethlehem Revisited”, an event portraying a full representation of life in Bethlehem when Christ was born. It includes replications of homes, shops and other facilities authentic to the time period. Costumed characters act out the roles of merchants, clergy, soldiers and other inhabitants. Camels, donkeys, goats and other animals are part of the event. “Bethlehem” takes place on the church property, just east of the main building. Today the event is a collaboration between several churches, businesses, organizations and individuals from the community. Bethlehem Revisited draws several thousands of visitors from throughout the region each Christmas season who are reminded that Jesus is the Reason for the Season.

== See also ==
- National Register of Historic Places listings in Ellis County, Texas
