= City Hall (Galveston, Texas) =

- Galveston City Hall
- U.S. National Register of Historic Places
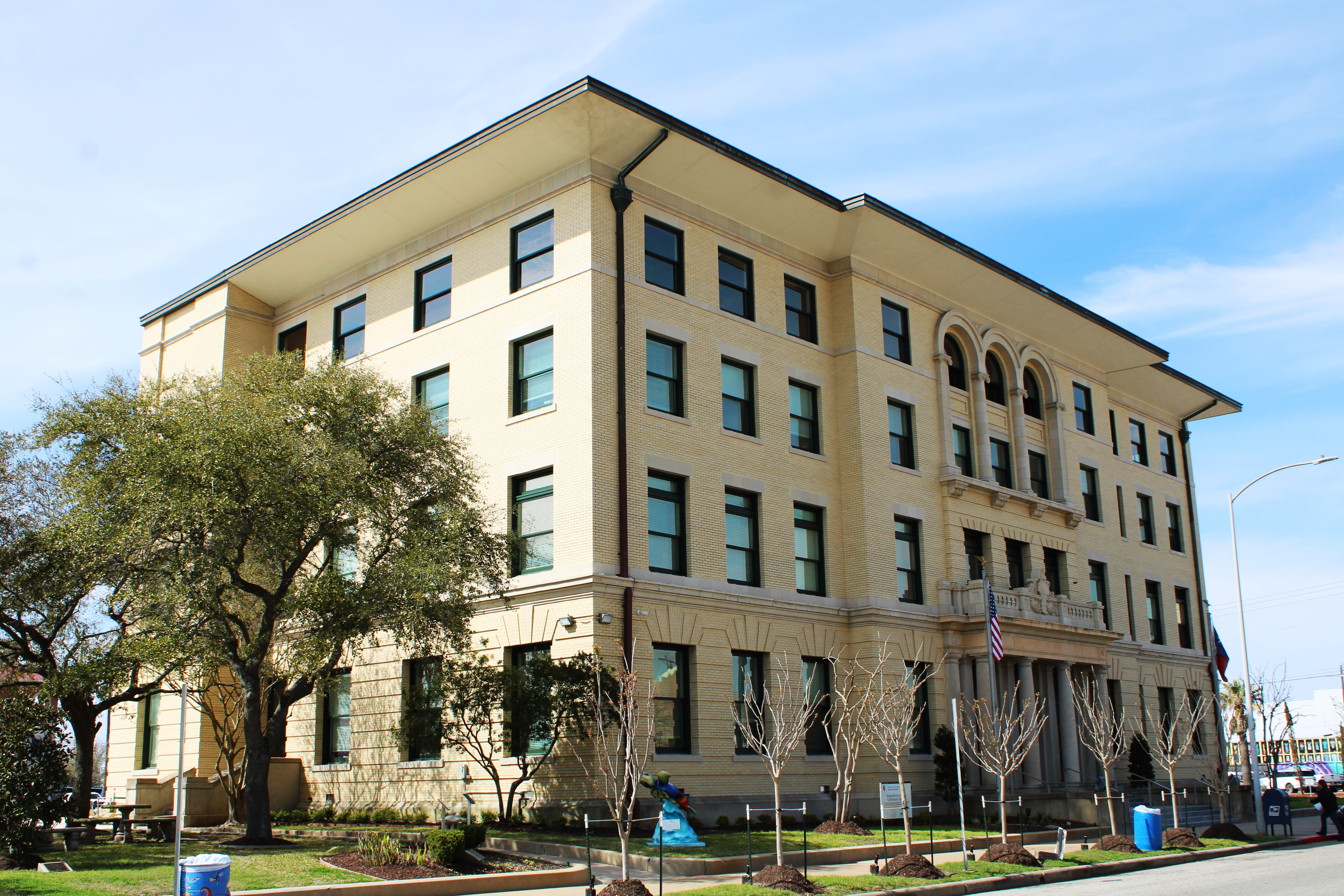
- Galveston City Hall

- Location within Texas Location within the United States
- Location: 823 Rosenberg Avenue; Galveston, Texas
- Coordinates: 29°18′01″N 94°47′43″W
- Built: 1916
- Architect: C. D. Hall & Company
- Architectural style: French Renaissance
- NRHP reference No.: 84001676
- Added to NRHP: August 14, 1984

The Galveston City Hall is located at 823 Rosenberg Avenue. It is the first of three city halls constructed for Galveston.

== History ==
=== Old City Hall ===
in 1846, Mayor John Sydnor proposed converting the old marketplace to a combined city hall and marketplace. The old market was located on municipally owned land on Market Street between 20th and 21st streets. Yet this plan lacked financing until the 1880s, when the city hired Alfred Muller to design a city hall. The cornerstone was laid on March 2, 1888. The French Renaissance-style building reserved the ground floor for the market stalls, with the top two floors for municipal offices. The building was flanked on the east and west by its staircases and supported by Ionic columns to the north, which were covered by a portico. This city hall was in use until 1916 and demolished in 1966.

=== 1916 City Hall ===
Originally conceived as part of a City Beautiful civic center, Galveston relocated its new city hall from the old city market site to Rosenberg Avenue. The architecture firm of C. D. Hill & Company also designed a city hall for Dallas, employed Italian forms for its palazzo-type structure and its portico. Originally designed with a civic auditorium attached, it was replaced by a fire station after Hurricane Carla.

== Bibliography ==
- Barnstone, Howard (1993). The Galveston that Was (Annotated reprint ed.). Houston: Museum of Fine Arts of Houston with Rice University Press. ISBN 978-0-89096-887-1.
- Beasley, Ellen; Fox, Stephen (1996). Galveston Architectural Guidebook. Houston: Rice University Press. ISBN 0-89263-345-X.
