= Hoblitzelle Foundation =

The Hoblitzelle Foundation is a foundation which makes grants to social service, educational, medical, and other organizations in Texas, particularly in the Dallas area.

Based in Dallas, the foundation was established by Karl and Esther Hoblitzelle in 1942.
