= Dallas Municipal Building =

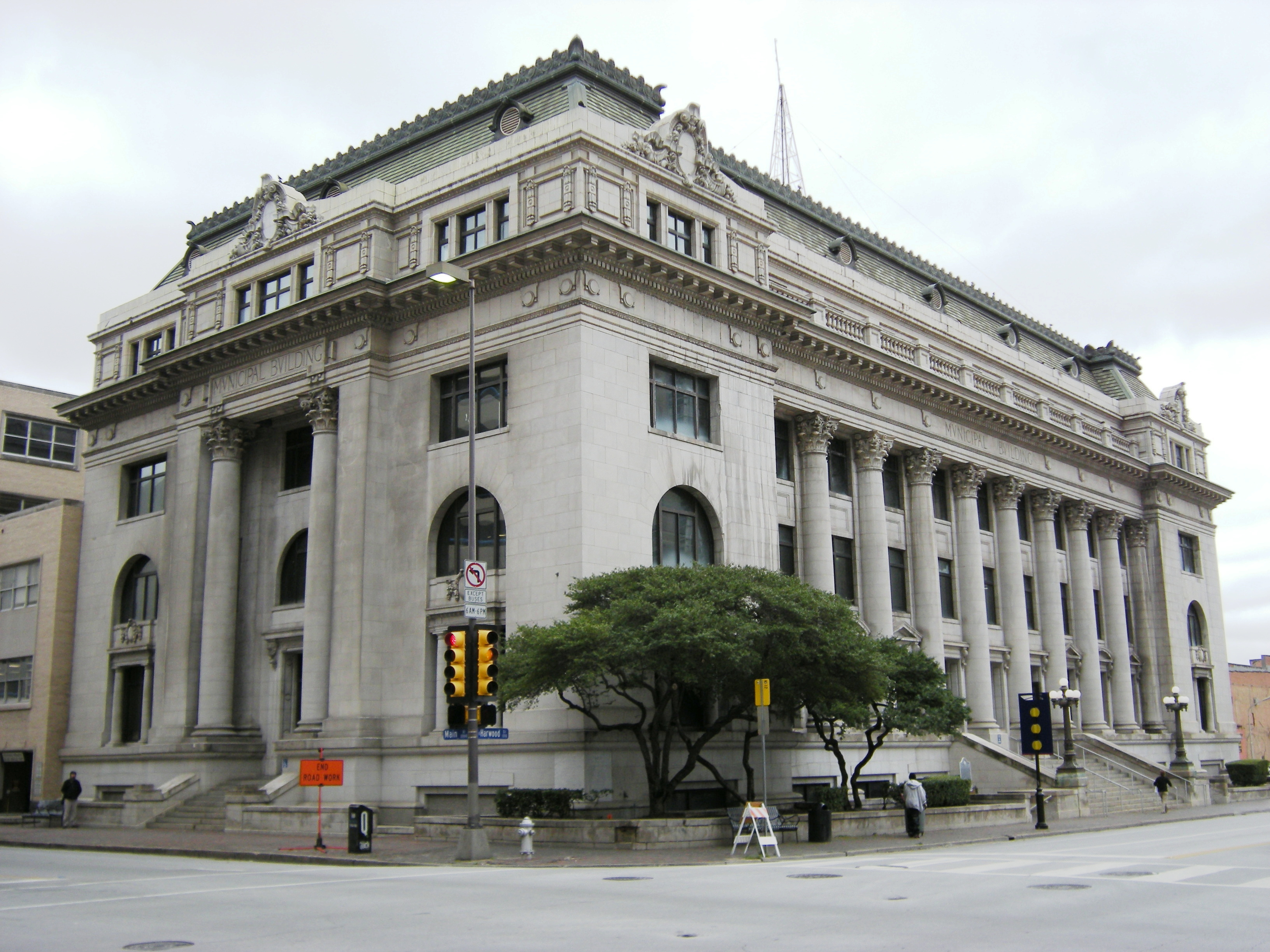
- Dallas Municipal Building
- Interactive map of the Dallas Municipal Building area

General information
- Status: In use
- Type: Municipal government
- Architectural style: Beaux-Arts
- Location: 106 S. Harwood St., Dallas, Texas, United States
- Coordinates: 32°46′53″N 96°47′37″W
- Construction started: 1913
- Opening: October 17, 1914
- Owner: City of Dallas

Technical details
- Grounds: 22,000 square feet (2,000 m^{2})

Design and construction
- Architects: C. D. Hill & Company; Mauran, Russell & Crowell
- Dallas City Hall and Municipal Building
- U.S. Historic district – Contributing property
- Recorded Texas Historic Landmark
- Dallas Landmark
- Dallas Landmark Historic District; Contributing Property
- Part of: Dallas Downtown Historic District (ID04000894)
- RTHL No.: 6664
- DLMK No.: H/17
- DLMKHD No.: H/48 (Harwood HD)

Significant dates
- Designated CP: August 11, 2006
- Designated RTHL: 1978
- Designated DLMK: March 17, 1982
- Designated DLMKHD: February 28, 1990

The Dallas Municipal Building is a Dallas Landmark located along S. Harwood Street between Main and Commerce Street in the Main Street District of downtown Dallas, Texas, and it served as the city's fourth City Hall. The structure is also a Recorded Texas Historic Landmark and a contributing property in the Harwood Street Historic District, located across the street from Main Street Garden Park.

== History ==
The City purchased land for the fourth City Hall between 1911 and 1912 from Eliza Trice, Otto H. Lang and the Sweeney Family. Designed by C. D. Hill & Company in the Beaux-Arts style, plans were drawn up in 1913 and the Spring Fred A. Jones Building Company began construction. The building company filed for bankruptcy later that year, and the Board of Commissioners passed a resolution to accept the sale and transfer of materials to C. C. Street, Jr., who completed the building. The Municipal Building opened on October 17, 1914.

In 1956, the Municipal Building Annex was completed at 2014 Main St. and attached as a connected building to 106 S. Harwood which became the home to the Dallas Police Department.

After the assassination of President John F. Kennedy, Lee Harvey Oswald was arrested and jailed in the Municipal Building on November 22, 1963. Two days later, Oswald was fatally shot by Jack Ruby while being led out by police in the basement garage.

Dallas City Hall vacated the structure in 1978 when it moved to its current location at 1500 Marilla St. In 2003, the Dallas Police Department moved its offices to the new Jack Evans Police Headquarters at 1400 S. Lamar St, leaving only municipal courts in the building. The building suffered partial abandonment and neglect as the city tried to find a new use for the historic structure.

On June 19, 2009, Texas Governor Rick Perry signed SB 956 into law, establishing the first public law school in North Texas. University of North Texas at Dallas College of Law planned to begin taking applications in the Fall of 2013 for classes that began in 2014. Initially, courses were held at the nearby Universities Center at Dallas, but the school renovated the Municipal Building for the law school. Renovations were complete in 2020 and the school moved to the former city hall building in July.

== See also ==
- National Register of Historic Places listings in Dallas County, Texas
- Recorded Texas Historic Landmarks in Dallas County
- List of Dallas Landmarks
