= Dallas Downtown Historic District =

Historic district in Texas, United States

- U.S. National Register of Historic Places
- U.S. Historic district
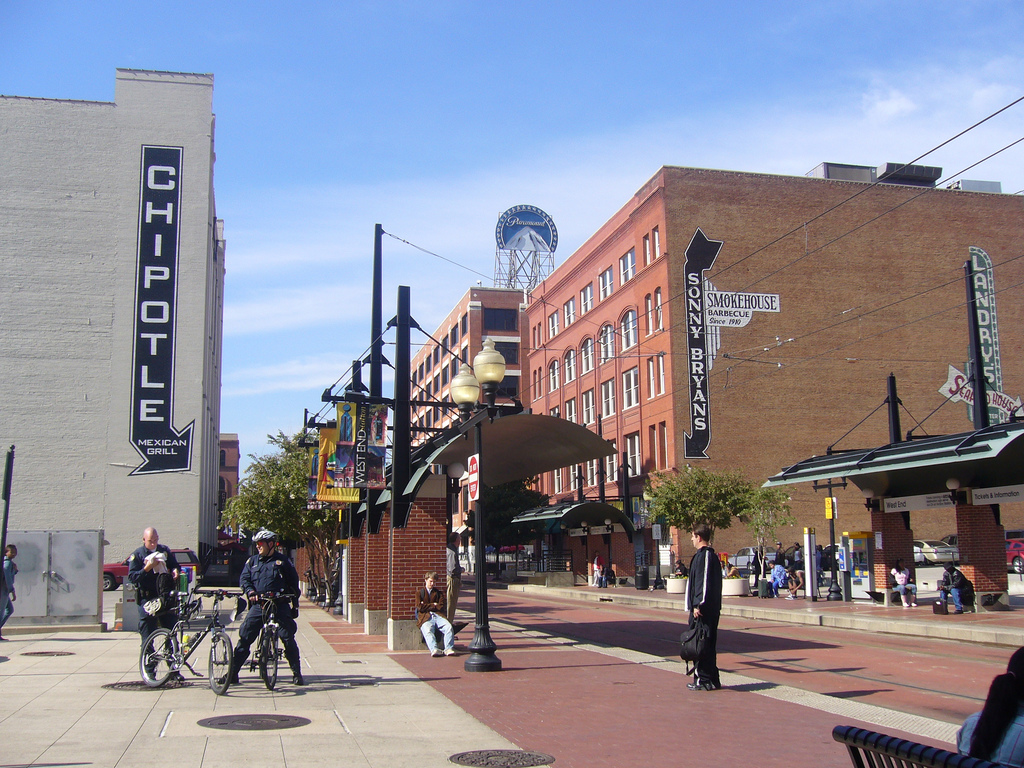
- Downtown Historic District in 2006

- Location within Texas Location within the United States
- Location: Roughly bounded by Federal, N. St. Paul, Pacific, Harwood, S. Pearl, Commerce, S. Harwood, Canton, S. Ervay, Akard, Commerce and Field, Dallas, Texas
- Coordinates: 32°46′45″N 96°48′01″W
- Area: 90.8 acres (36.7 ha) Original; 555 acres (225 ha) After increase
- Architect: Walter Ahlschlager, et al
- Architectural style: Multiple
- NRHP reference No.: 04000894 (original); 08001299 (increase 1); 100013180 (increase 2)

Significant dates
- Added to NRHP: August 11, 2006
- Boundary increases: January 9, 2009; June 29, 2026

The Dallas Downtown Historic District is a 555-acre (225 ha) area in downtown Dallas, Texas, United States, that was designated a historic district in 2006 and expanded in 2009 to preserve the diverse architectural history of the area.

== Contributing properties ==
- 211 North Ervay
- Adolphus Hotel*
- Continental Building
- Corrigan Tower
- Drakestone*
- First Presbyterian Church
- Former Federal Reserve Bank of Dallas Building
- Hilton Hotel*
- Joule Hotel*
- Kirby Building*
- Majestic Theatre*
- Magnolia Hotel*
- Municipal Building
- Mercantile National Bank Building
- Neiman Marcus Building
- Old Dallas Central Library
- Republic Center*
- Scottish Rite Temple*
- Titche–Goettinger Building*
- Tower Petroleum Building
- Wilson Building*

* Individually listed

== Gallery ==
Joule Hotel with The Merc

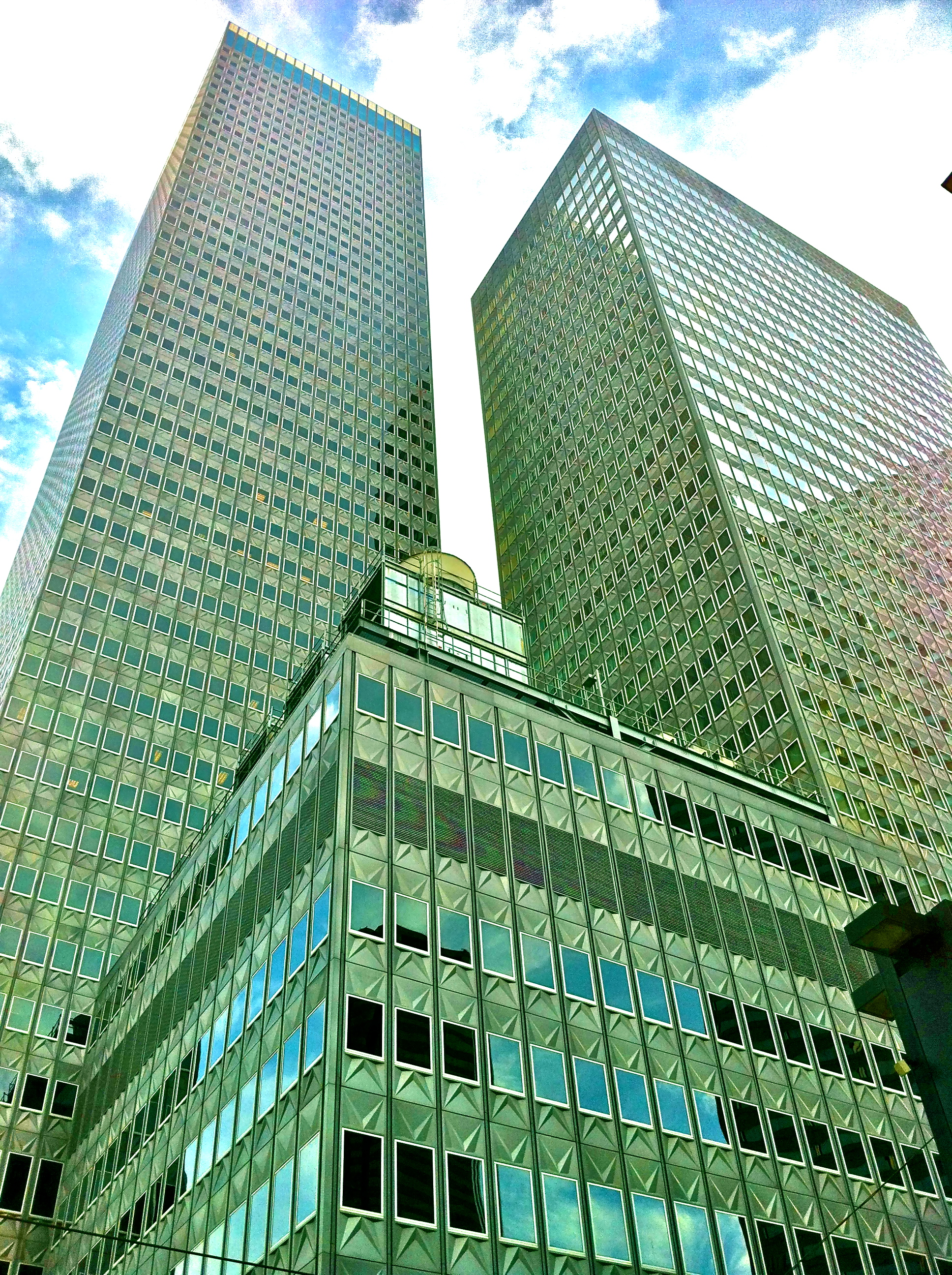
Republic Center

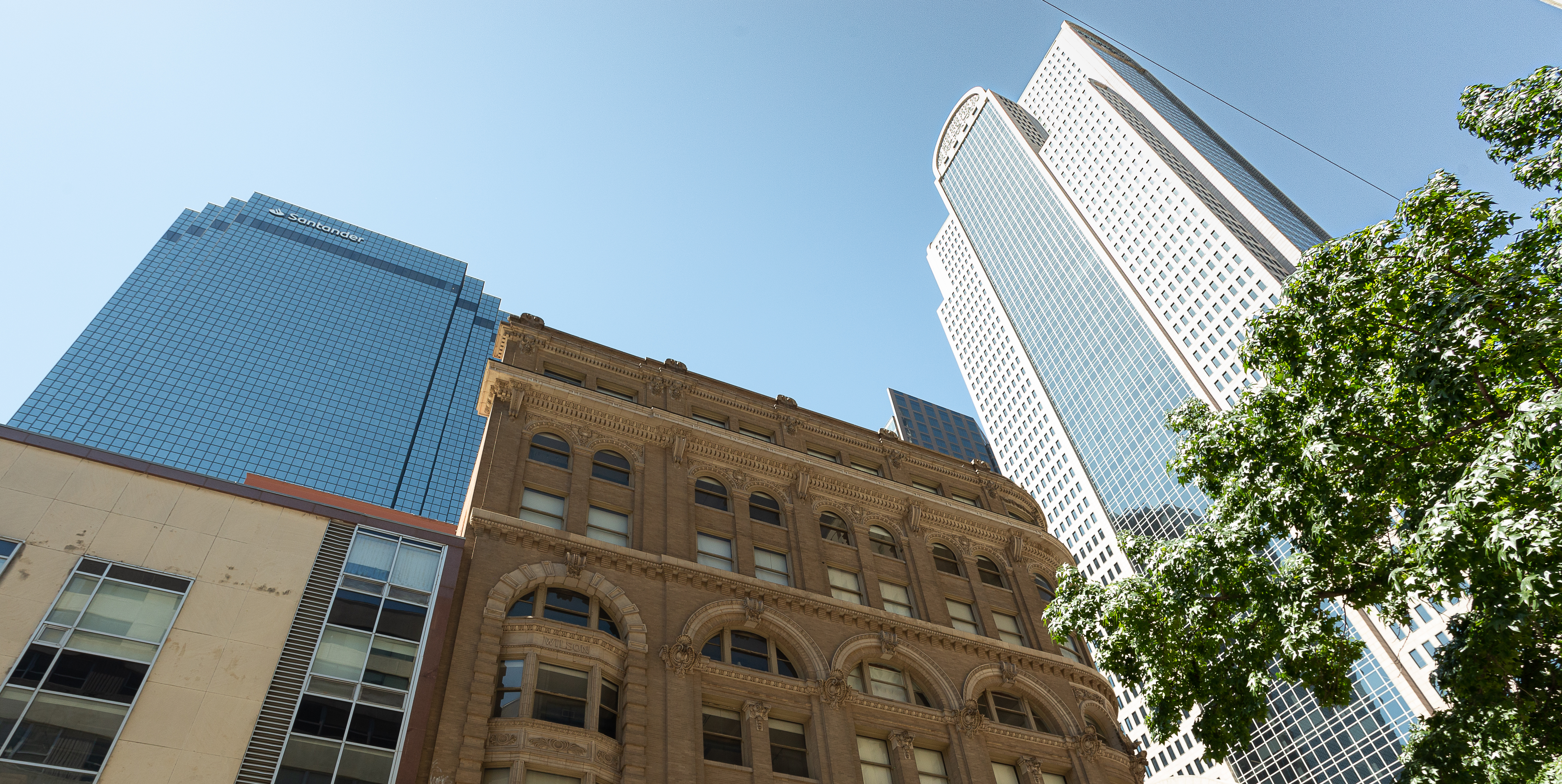
Wilson Building with Santander and Comerica towers

== See also ==
- National Register of Historic Places listings in Dallas County, Texas
- Recorded Texas Historic Landmarks in Dallas County
- List of Dallas Landmarks
