= Bender Hotel (Houston) =

Former hotel in Houston, Texas

Coordinates: 29.7580°N 95.3644°W

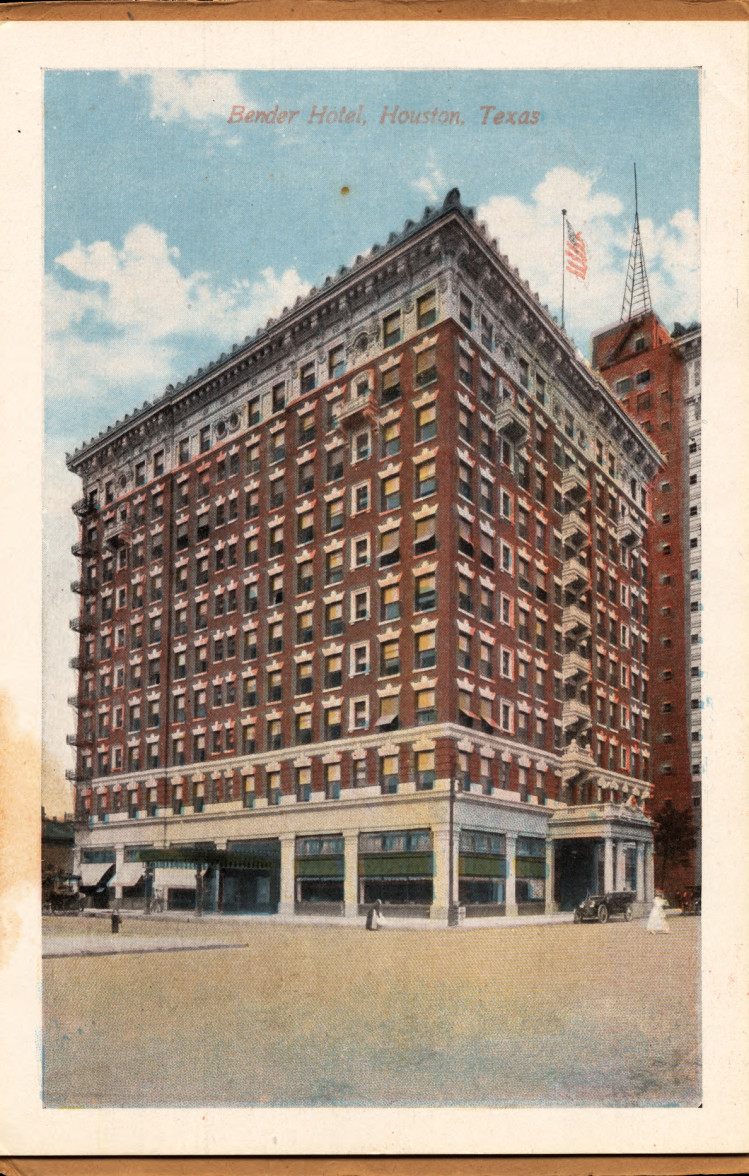
Bender Hotel, Houston, Texas

The Bender Hotel was a ten-story building in Downtown Houston on Main Street at the corner of Walker. It was later known as the San Jacinto Hotel, and later repurposed as an office building before it was demolished.

== History ==
The Bender Hotel, constructed in 1911, was named for its original owner E.L. Bender. It was later renamed the San Jacinto Hotel. On site services included a cafeteria, drug store, and a Victorian-style Turkish bath. The building was converted to use as an office building in 1950.

Fred A. Jones Company constructed the ten-story building, one of several buildings it had under contract in Houston. The building was framed in steel and concrete, then faced with red brick with terra cotta trim, and granitic ornament at the base. Final construction cost was US$600,000.

The Bender Hotel's original interiors included marble and bronze ornamentation, decorated in a Louis XVI motif throughout. Meals were served in the tenth-floor banquet hall and two dining rooms: one at the ground floor and another on the roof top. The hotel also included a parlor on the second-floor mezzanine, a tenth-floor ballroom, and a rooftop garden.
