= Pioneer Park Cemetery =

Historic graveyards in Downtown Dallas, Dallas County, Texas

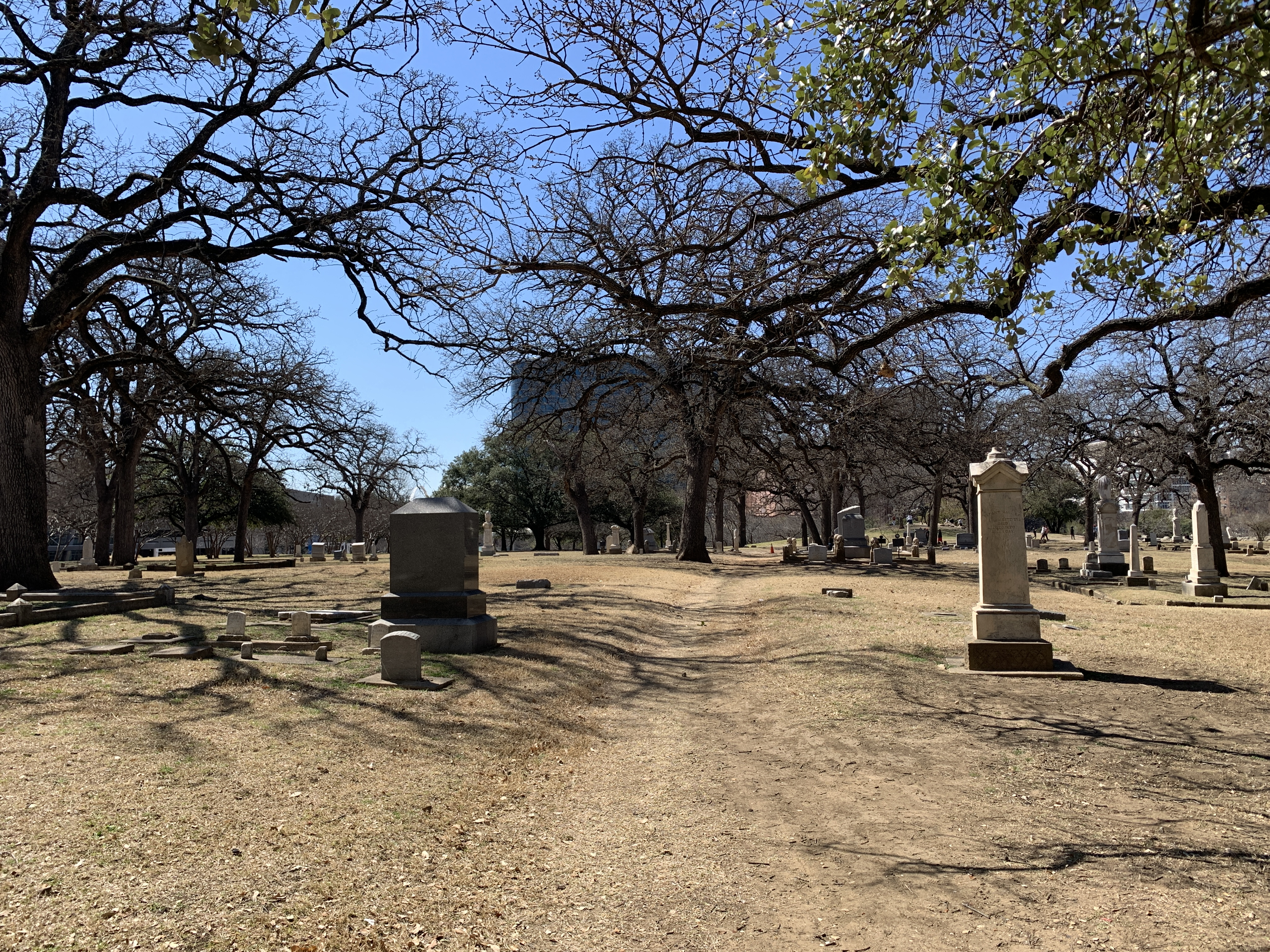
- Interactive map of Pioneer Park Cemetery

Details
- Established: 1849
- Location: Dallas, Texas
- Country: United States
- Coordinates: 32°46′34″N 96°48′02″W
- Find a Grave: Pioneer Park Cemetery

Pioneer Park Cemetery is a conglomeration of four graveyards with the remains of several of the city's earliest founders. It is located in the Convention Center District of downtown Dallas, Texas, US, and directly east of Pioneer Plaza. The four graveyards were known as Masonic Cemetery, the Odd Fellow's Cemetery, the Jewish Cemetery, and the City Cemetery.

== History ==
Established in 1849, Pioneer Park Cemetery is the final resting place for four Dallas mayors, early city business leaders, and fighters from the Texas Revolution. John McClannahan Crockett, Dallas mayor and Lieutenant Governor of Texas during the American Civil War, is among those buried here. The last person was interred in the cemetery in 1921.

== Confederate War Memorial ==
Originally located in Old City Park, the Confederate War Memorial was moved to Pioneer Park Cemetery in 1961 to accommodate construction of R.L. Thornton Freeway. The Dallas City Council approved removal of the monument in February 2019 but the effort was blocked by a state appeals court. In June 2020, during nationwide George Floyd protests, the appeals court approved the immediate removal of the monument to prevent injury to protesters during potential attempts to topple it, and it was removed later that month for storage at the Grand Prairie Armed Forces Reserve Complex.

== Notable burials ==
- John McClannahan Crockett (1816–1887), Texas politician
- John Jay Good (1827–1882), Dallas Mayor and Civil War Confederate Army officer
- Samuel B. Pryor (1816–1866), Dallas Mayor and Confederate Army lieutenant
