= White Rock Creek =

Creek in Collin and Dallas Counties, North Central Texas

Coordinates: 32°58′06″N 96°48′32″W

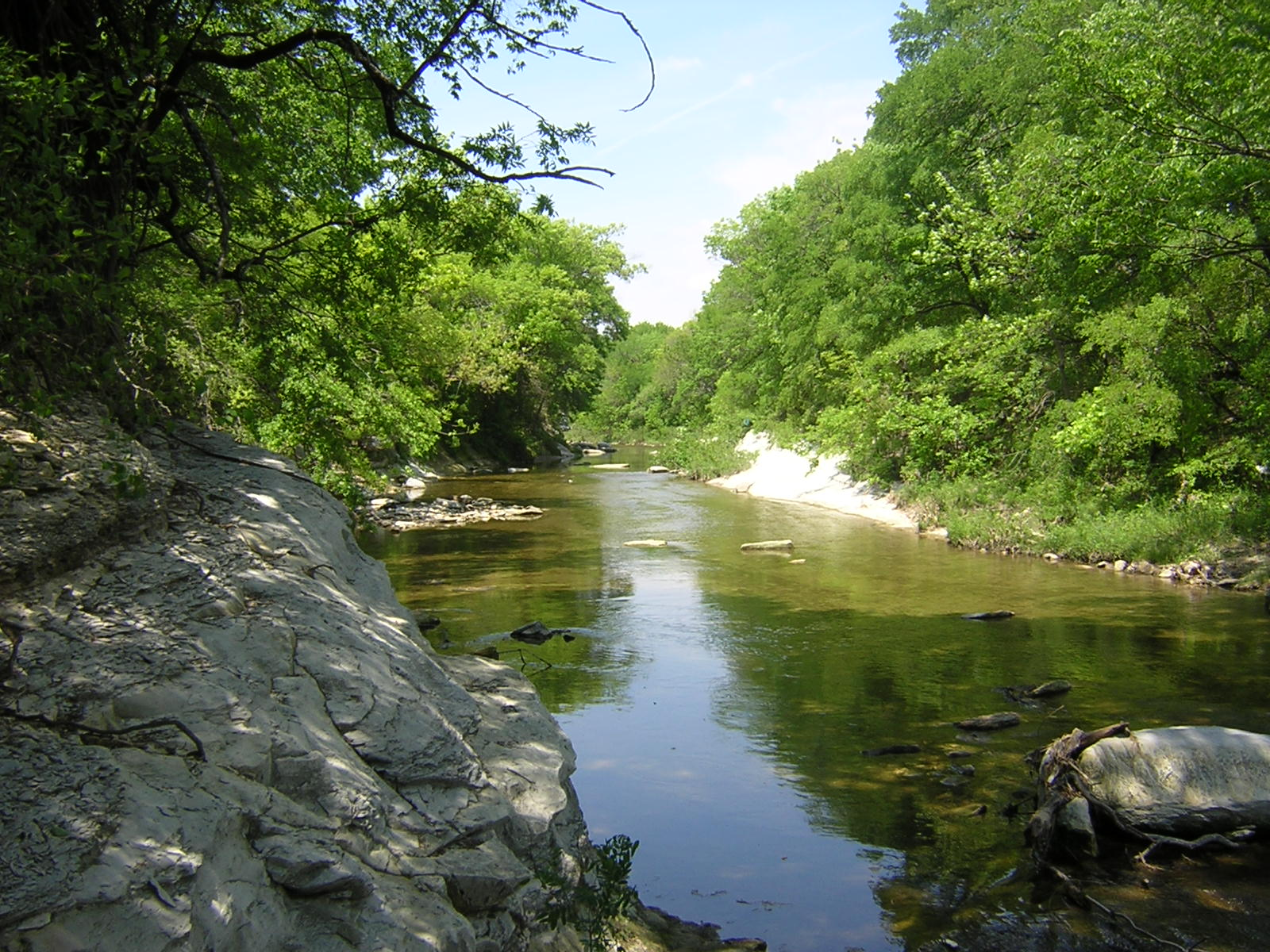
A view of White Rock Creek in early spring, clearly showing the ubiquitous white chalk from which the creek takes its name.

White Rock Creek is a 30 miles (48 km) creek occupying a chain of four sub-watersheds within the Trinity River watershed. From its source near Frisco, Texas at, this creek runs south-by-south-east through suburban Dallas for 23.5 miles (37.8 km) where it widens into White Rock Lake, then continues south for another 8 miles (13 km) to its mouth on the East Fork of the Trinity River, of which it is a major tributary.

Despite running through one of the most populous areas of Texas, and flowing under many major roads and highways, its banks remain heavily wooded and undisturbed in many places and many local parks are situated within its watershed, which is generally considered to extend 2 miles (3.2 km) to 2.5 miles (4.0 km) either side of its path.

At least eight "White Rock Creeks" exist in the Dallas metro area; this article describes the White Rock Creek of Collin County and Dallas County, Texas which feeds into White Rock Lake.

== Course ==
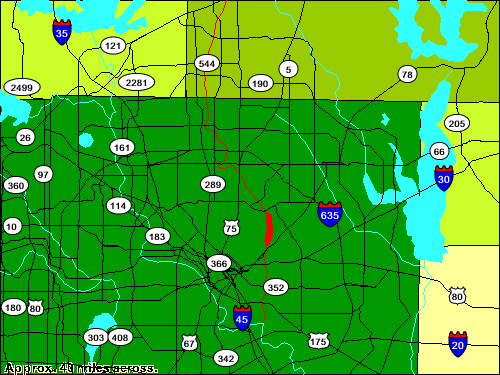
White Rock Creek (and White Rock Lake) are shown in red on this street map. Green-shaded regions delimit county boundaries.

Intermittent in its upper reaches, the creek flows south, generally parallel to and between the Dallas North Tollway and Preston Road (State Highway 289). Its upper stretch flows from Frisco east of Preston, crossing under the Sam Rayburn Tollway State Highway 121. It crosses under Preston Road near Hedgcoxe Road in Plano.

Widening slightly as it flows south and crosses Legacy Drive, the creek continues a southerly course through Plano between Preston Road and the Dallas North Tollway, narrowing again as it crosses West Spring Creek Parkway. It next crosses under West Parker Road where it passes through the Gleneagles Country Club. A number of parks encompass the creek as it next crosses under West Park Boulevard (FM 544). Still following a course between Preston and the Dallas North Tollway, the creek crosses West Plano Parkway, Atchison, Topeka and Santa Fe Railway tracks, President George Bush Turnpike, where it enters the City of Dallas. It continues past Frankford Road, runs through Preston Trail Golf Course, crosses under Keller Springs Road, Southern Pacific Railroad tracks, runs through Prestonwood Country Club where it is joined by McKamy Brook, then crosses Arapaho Road and Belt Line Road.

After crossing Belt Line, the creek cuts east under Preston but quickly returns to a south-easterly course. From here, the creek meanders further and further east of Preston, no longer following it (or rather, Preston no longer follows the creek). The creek crosses Hillcrest Road just north of Interstate 635, it then flows under Interstate 635 just east of Hillcrest, flows adjacent to Park Central drive and along the western edge of Medical City Dallas Hospital complex, where it widens, then flows under U.S. Highway 75 (North Central Expressway) south of Forest Lane. From Belt Line Road to White Rock Lake, the creek's lowland flood plain is a park and a popular bicycling and running venue for Dallas residents.

DART rail bridges the creek east of US 75, where Johnson Creek joins White Rock Creek. The creek crosses Royal Lane where, at this point, it has entered a more urban environment, crossing under Greenville Avenue and Walnut Hill Lane east of Presbyterian Hospital-Dallas. From here, Cottonwood Creek (containing Floyd Brook) joins White Rock Creek which soon enters (or creates) White Rock Lake, a man-made reservoir no more than 20 feet (6 m) deep serving the city of Dallas. After White Rock Lake, the creek flows south past Interstate 30 and U.S. Highway 175 (the C.F. Hawn Freeway) and merges with the Trinity River.

== Geology and ecology ==
The creek (and the lake it feeds) takes its name from the weathered-white Austin Chalk which lines its bed and banks, thus revealing its place geologically within the Balcones Escarpment. In some places, this chalk becomes quite conspicuous as the creek cuts deep through canyon-like walls of rock and tree roots. Considered part of the Texas Blackland Prairie (locally White Rock Prairie) and Bottomland Forest ecosystems, the creek is host to multitudes of flora and fauna.

Wildlife includes river otter, mink, bobcats, coyotes, red fox, ducks, raccoons, skunks, opossum, armadillos, gray squirrels, mice, rats and eastern cottontails. Where the banks are muddy, crayfish make their conical-shaped homes. Many birds including great blue herons, great egrets and belted kingfishers make their homes along and eat from the creek, and double-crested cormorants, American white pelicans and American coots often visit the lake. Herpetofauna include lizards, water moccasins, salamanders, red-eared sliders and common snapping turtles. The most common fish are sunfish, largemouth bass, white crappie and channel catfish.

The most common trees are cedar elm, pecan and green ash. Forbs are encountered in the drier areas, whereas species more adapted to flooding are found where the banks are lower, such as cottonwood, black willow, American elm, sycamore, hackberry, chinquapin oak, and Texas buckeye. Berry-producing trees along the creek include yaupon holly, cherry laurel, fruiting mulberry, rusty blackhaw, and American sweetgum.

In June 2018, over one million gallons of untreated waste spilled into the creek. Construction was being done at a car dealership in Plano when they bored into a waste pipeline. As of 2018, it was not known what permanent ecological damage was done by the spill.

== See also ==
- List of rivers of Texas
