= Robert Summers (artist) =

American painter (born 1940)

Robert Temple Summers II (born August 13, 1940) is an American artist in Glen Rose, Texas. Summers, who works as a painter and sculptor, has created prominent bronze works displayed in places such as the Texas Ranger Hall of Fame and Museum, the Dallas Pioneer Park the Loews Anatole Hotel, Fair Park, Los Angeles International Airport, and Plano Texas' Baccus Plaza.

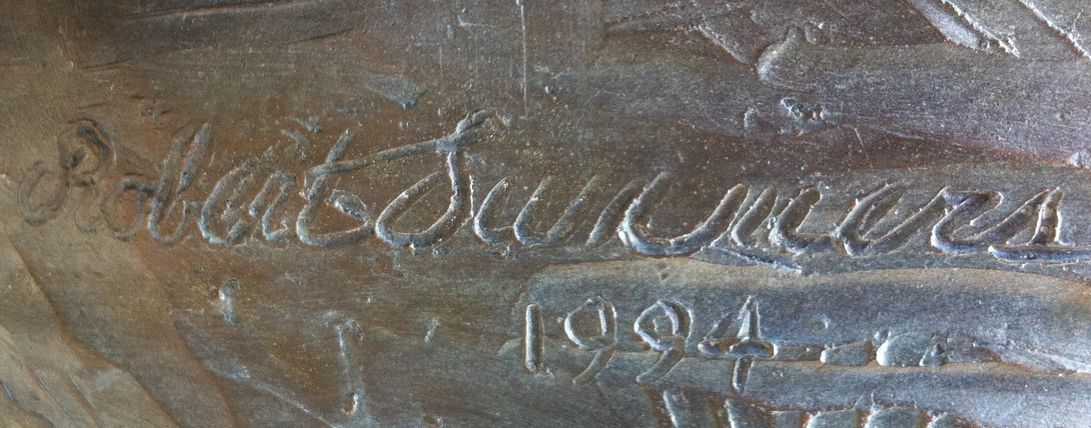
Signature of Robert Summers

Summers' studio website, states that Summers has had "no formal art training, save a short course in mixing colors at age 15. He began to explore art as a profession in 1964. His paintings include works in various mediums including; egg and acrylic tempera, oil, dry-brush watercolor, pastel, and pencil. His sculptures have included wax and clay, and currently divides his time between painting and sculpting. He describes his flat work as "painterly

Summers resides in his boyhood home of Glen Rose, Texas with his wife Boo, two of their three sons work with him. Among his associations, Robert serves as Associate Director of the Creation Evidence Museum and has traveled to Turkey and New Guinea on archaeological expeditions in that capacity. Summers also plays bagpipes, practices falconry, sings Contemporary Christian music, and has played lead roles in several professional productions. Much of his Western art demonstrates his love of wildlife and the cowboy spirit of the small Texas town.

== Major works ==
Created a life-size, standing figure of a Texas Ranger which is on display at the Texas Ranger Hall of Fame in Waco, Texas.

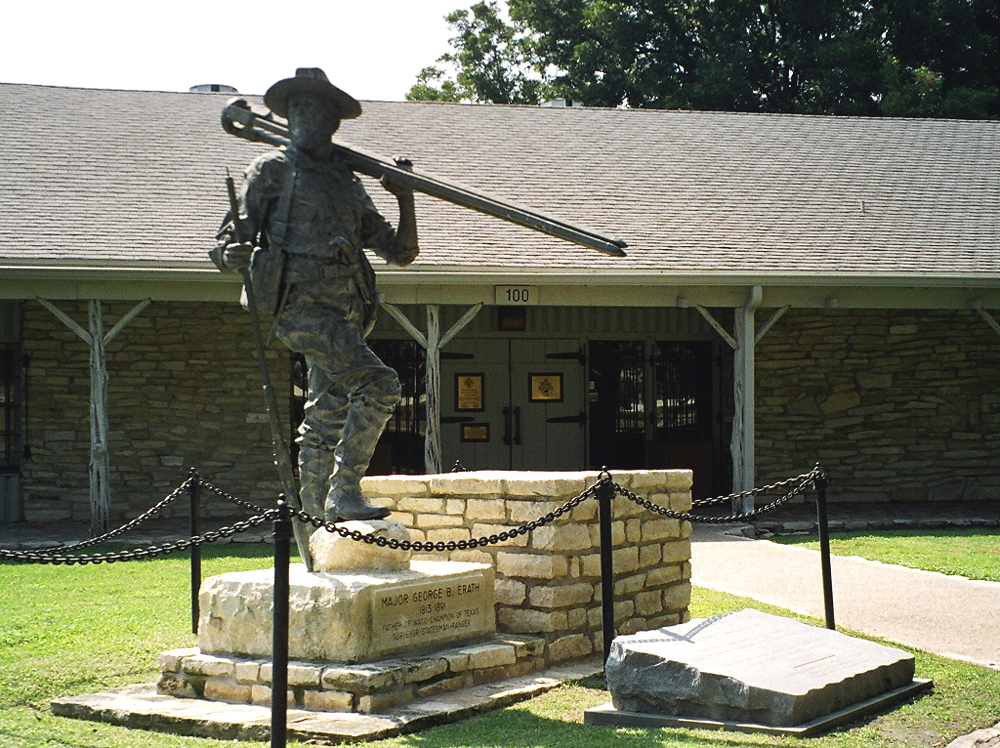
Main entrance to the Texas Ranger Hall of Fame and Museum in Waco, Texas. The statue is of Major B. George Erath, Texas Ranger and surveyor of the Waco townsite.

Created a larger-than-life, standing figure of Texas pioneer, Major George B. Erath, also on display at the Texas Ranger Hall of Fame.

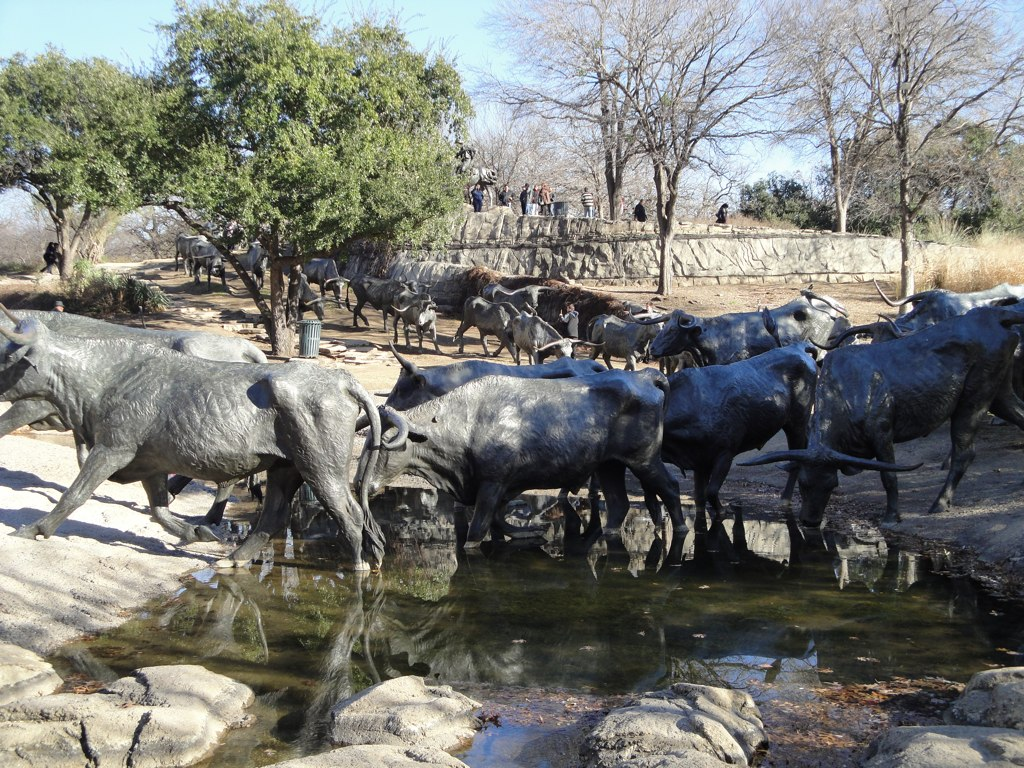
Bronze figures of cattle and cowboys, Pioneer Plaza, Dallas, TX

Commissioned to sculpt the nine-foot-tall statue of John Wayne for the John Wayne Airport in Orange County California in October 1980. During the project Summers worked closely with the Wayne family, after which Patrick Wayne commented, "this is the first time I have seen my father since he died".

In May 1985, the 69th Texas Legislature passed House Bill #33 approving the placement of a monumental bronze by Robert Summers on the Capitol Grounds in Austin (this being the first sculpture approved for placement on the grounds for nearly 100 years). At present the project is still under consideration and work has not begun.

In 1987, Summers completed a three-quarter life-size version of "Texas Legacy" (the above-mentioned monument). The sculpture measures 20'x12'x7' and depicts two cowboys on horseback leading seven Longhorn cattle over a rail-road crossing and is on display at the main entrance of the Astro Hall at the Astrodomain in Houston, Texas.

In 1990, commissioned by the United States Navy Memorial Foundation to sculpt three large bas-relief bronzes showing various historical events and duties of the United States Navy and Coast Guard. The bas-relieves are part of the United States Navy Memorial on Pennsylvania Avenue in Washington D.C.

In February 1992 work was completed on a nine-foot statue of golf legend Byron Nelson. Commissioned by the U.S.A.A., the bronze is prominently located near the first tee at the TPC course at the Four Seasons Resort and Club at Las Colinas in Irving, Texas.

In November 1992 Summers began work on the largest arrangement of bronze statues in North America. A brain-child of real-estate magnate Trammell Crow and commissioned by Dallas Trees and Parks Foundation, the project contains three cowboys on horseback and 40+ Longhorn steers in Pioneer Plaza, each piece being 130% life size. 30 additional steers will eventually be installed. The bronze trail drive covers 4 acres (16,000 m^{2}) in downtown Dallas adjacent to the Dallas Convention Center. This project was a break-through in that the artist designed both the sculptures as well as the landscaping. It is internationally known and the most photographed landmark in Dallas.

In 1996 Summers finished three 130% life-size monuments of three prominent Dallas citizens including; Trammell Crow, on display at the Anatole Hotel, and Tom Hughes, former Director of the Dallas Summer Musicals, on display in at the Music Hall at Fair Park, in Dallas, Texas.

He was commissioned by [Newmark Publishing] in Louisville, Kentucky to complete a series of Civil War paintings covering the "Peninsula Campaign".

In early 1999, Summers was commissioned to sculpt a 150% life-size monumental portrait of American cattleman John Chisum by the John Chisum Memorial Foundation in Roswell, New Mexico. The monument contains a rider on horseback and one Longhorn steer. It was installed adjacent to the Chaves County Court House in Roswell on March 24, 2001.

After completion of the John Chisum sculpture for Roswell, the neighboring city of Artesia asked Summers to sculpt a twice life sized sculpture of John Chisum's niece, Sally Chisum. Dedicated on July 26, 2001, the 11-foot-tall (3.4 m) sculpture of Sally stands as she reads to two children, as an addition to Artesia's Main Street Project.

Soon after the installment of “Sally”, Artesia again called upon Summers to represent Mary and Martin Yates, founders of Yates Petroleum. This 125% monument is currently installed and awaits the arrival (completion) of their partner “Van Welch” also in 125% scale, which was subsequently commissioned to be an addition to the composition.

In 2007, Summers completed a bronze statue titled "Barnard's of the Brazos - The First Family of Glen Rose", depicting Charles and Juana Cavasos Barnard, founding patriarchs of Glen Rose, TX. It is displayed in front of the Sommervell County court house in Glen Rose.

In 2008, Summers began a multi-sculpture project called "Branding the Brazos." The sculptures include longhorn cattle, a cowboy (added in 2013), and a Vaquero (added in 2014) and will eventually include a black drover as well. It is displayed at Indian Springs Park, in Waco, Texas in front of the Waco Suspension Bridge, which was a key spot for cattle drivers to cross the Brazos River on their way up the Chisholm Trail.
