= Robert E. Lee on Traveller =

Sculpture by Alexander Phimister Proctor

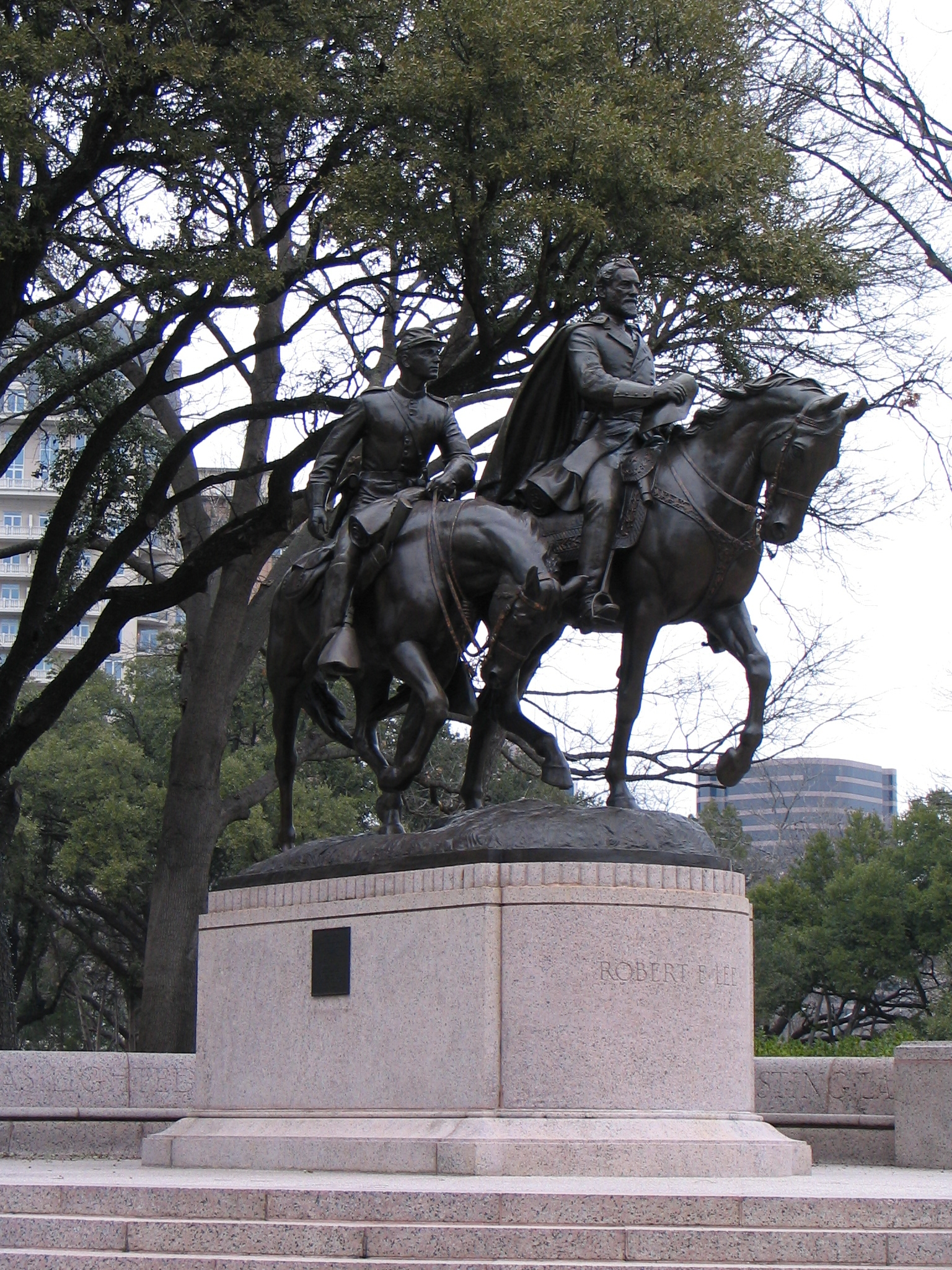
- The statue in 2007
- Artist: Alexander Phimister Proctor
- Year: 1936
- Medium: Bronze sculpture
- Subject: Robert E. Lee; Traveller
- Dimensions: 2.7 m × 3.7 m × 1.5 m (9 ft × 12 ft × 5 ft)

Robert E. Lee on Traveller (also known as General Robert E. Lee and Confederate Soldier, and Robert E. Lee and Young Soldier) is a bronze sculpture by Alexander Phimister Proctor depicting the Confederate general of the same name, his horse Traveller, and a young Confederate States Army officer, formerly installed at Dallas' Turtle Creek Park, in the U.S. state of Texas. The statue was unveiled by President Franklin D. Roosevelt in 1936, removed in 2017, and sold by the city for $1,435,000 to a law firm. It now stands on a Texan golf course.

== Description ==
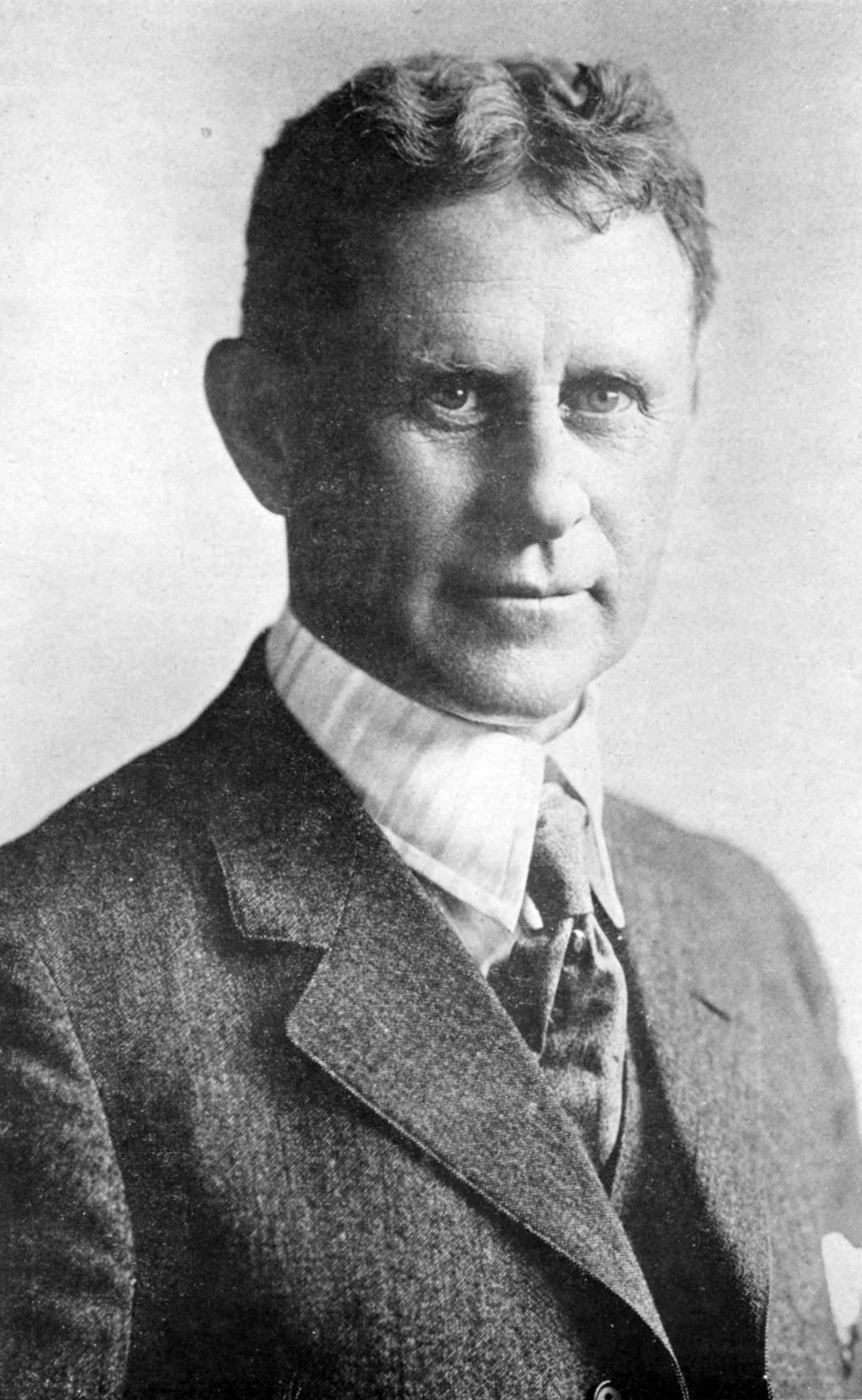
Alexander Phimister Proctor, 1919

The double equestrian statue depicts Robert E. Lee riding his horse Traveller, and a young Confederate States Army soldier astride a horse. The bronze sculpture measures approximately 9 × 12 × 5 ft (3 × 4 × 1.5 m) and rests on a Texas pink granite base that measures approximately 6 ft. × 12 ft. 6 in. × 6 ft (2 × 4 × 2 m) and weighs 7 tons. An inscription on the front of the base reads, "Robert E. Lee". Inscriptions on the base's sides read "A.P. PROCTOR – 1936", "A. Phimister Proctor, Sculptor/Mark Lemmon, Architect", and "Roman Bronze Works N.Y."

One bronze plaque on the back of the base reads:

Adopted and restored October 1991 through the generosity of Carl B. and Florence E. King Foundation / Communities Foundation of Texas / Margaret Hunt Hill / Mr. and Mrs. John M. Stemmons / Mr. and Mrs. Charles E. Seay / The Family of Mrs. J. Early Lee / Barbara Foree Langston in memory of Robert L. Foree and Mrs. Kenneth Foree / Frank Ribelin / Kappa Alpha Order, Dallas Area Alumni / The Dallas Southern Memorial Association / Adopt-A-Monument.

Another reads, "This bronze statue of General Robert E. Lee was presented to the City of Dallas on June 12, 1936, by the Dallas Southern Memorial Association / Lee Memorial Company / Elizabeth Rembert Rogers, Chairman." A third reads, "The soldier accompanying General Lee represents the entire youth of the South to whom General Lee became a great inspiration. He was not intended by the sculptor to be an aide-de-camp."

== History ==
=== Creation ===
The statue Robert E. Lee on Traveller was made by Alexander Phimister Proctor. When Proctor was hired by the Southern Women's Memorial Association to design an equestrian statue of Lee, he initially planned for the statue to depict Lee and a young Confederate States Army soldier heading into a storm with their heads down and the heads of their mounts lowered. Members of the Association were offended that the statue would depict a defeated South, so Proctor redesigned the statue to depict Lee as confidently marching forward. This new design was quickly and enthusiastically approved by members of the association and by Lee's grandson. The statue cost $50,000. Proctor eventually would come to believe that Lee "was never personally defeated," an idea popular in the Southern United States. Proctor modeled his likenesses of Lee on old photographs while basing his likeness of Lee's horse, Traveller, on a horse owned by a friend, the general's writings, and photographs of Traveller. It took Proctor two years to complete a working model of the statue and another two years to complete the finished statue. The statue was originally planned to be put in Dealey Plaza, though it was erected in Oak Lawn Park.

=== Unveiling ===
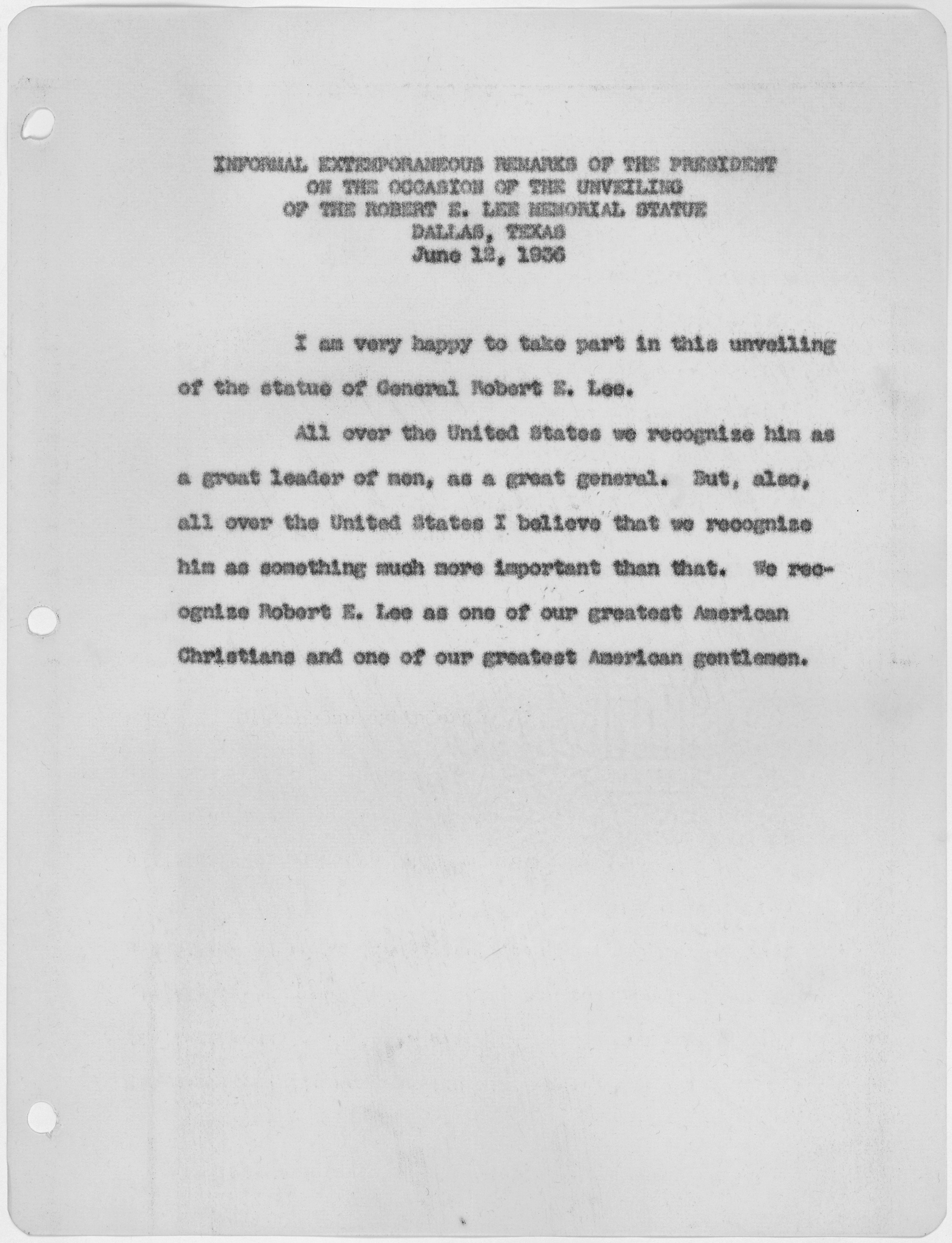
President Franklin D. Roosevelt's remarks given June 12, 1936

The statue was unveiled on June 12, 1936, by President Franklin D. Roosevelt to honor Confederate veterans. On that day, President Roosevelt gave a speech praising the general, saying:

I am very happy to take part in this unveiling of the statue of General Robert E. Lee. All over the United States we recognize him as a great leader of men, as a great general. But, also, all over the United States I believe that we recognize him as something much more important than that. We recognize Robert E. Lee as one of our greatest American Christians and one of our greatest American gentlemen.

Robert E. Lee IV handed President Roosevelt a ribbon to pull, unveiling the statue. When the president saw the statue, Proctor heard him call it "magnificent!". Then W. H. Wells, one of the remaining soldiers who fought in Lee's army, was escorted to see the president through the crowd of people attending the unveiling ceremony. American flags, Confederate flags, and Lone Star flags were flown during the ceremony. The unveiling of Robert E. Lee on Traveller caused no controversy. Yoni Appelbaum of The Atlantic contextualized Roosevelt's comments as part of a trend of American presidents praising Lee. He noted that Woodrow Wilson, Dwight D. Eisenhower, John F. Kennedy, Lyndon B. Johnson, Gerald Ford, Jimmy Carter, Ronald Reagan, George W. Bush and Donald Trump all complimented General Lee, though he felt Trump's praise was relatively meager.

=== Subsequent history ===
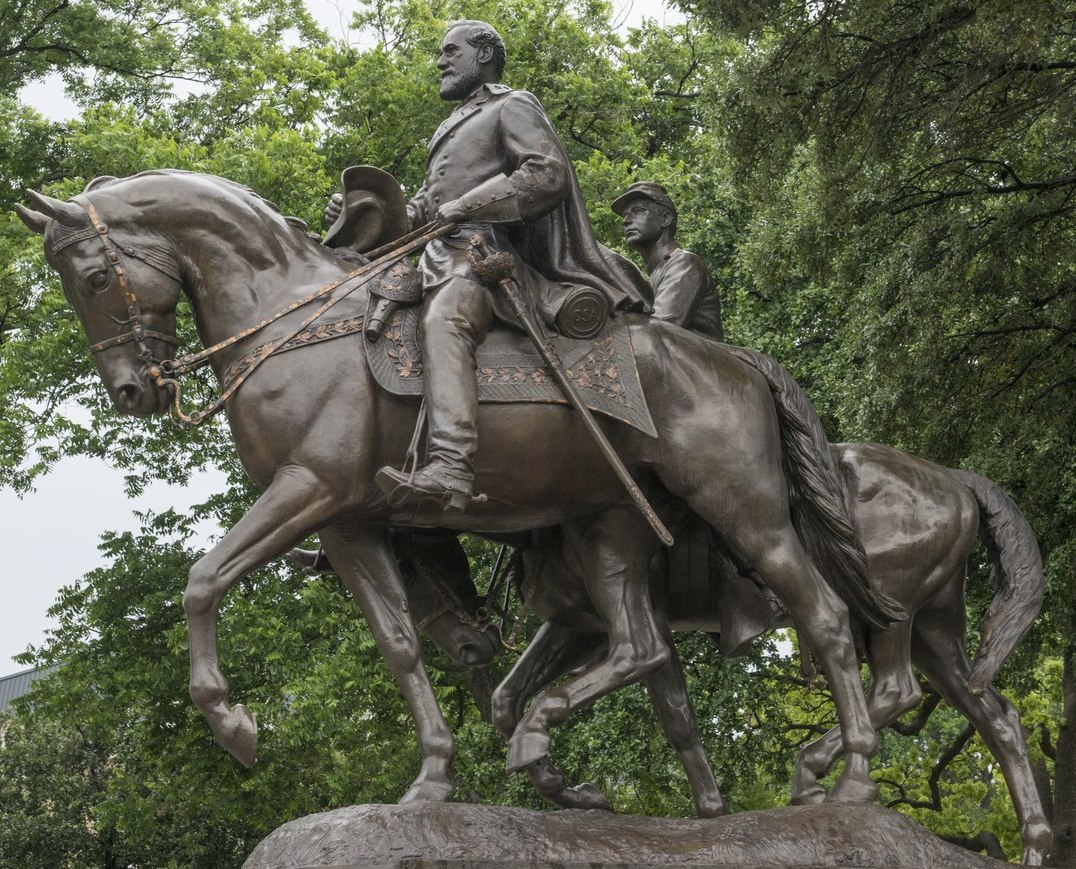
The statue in 2014

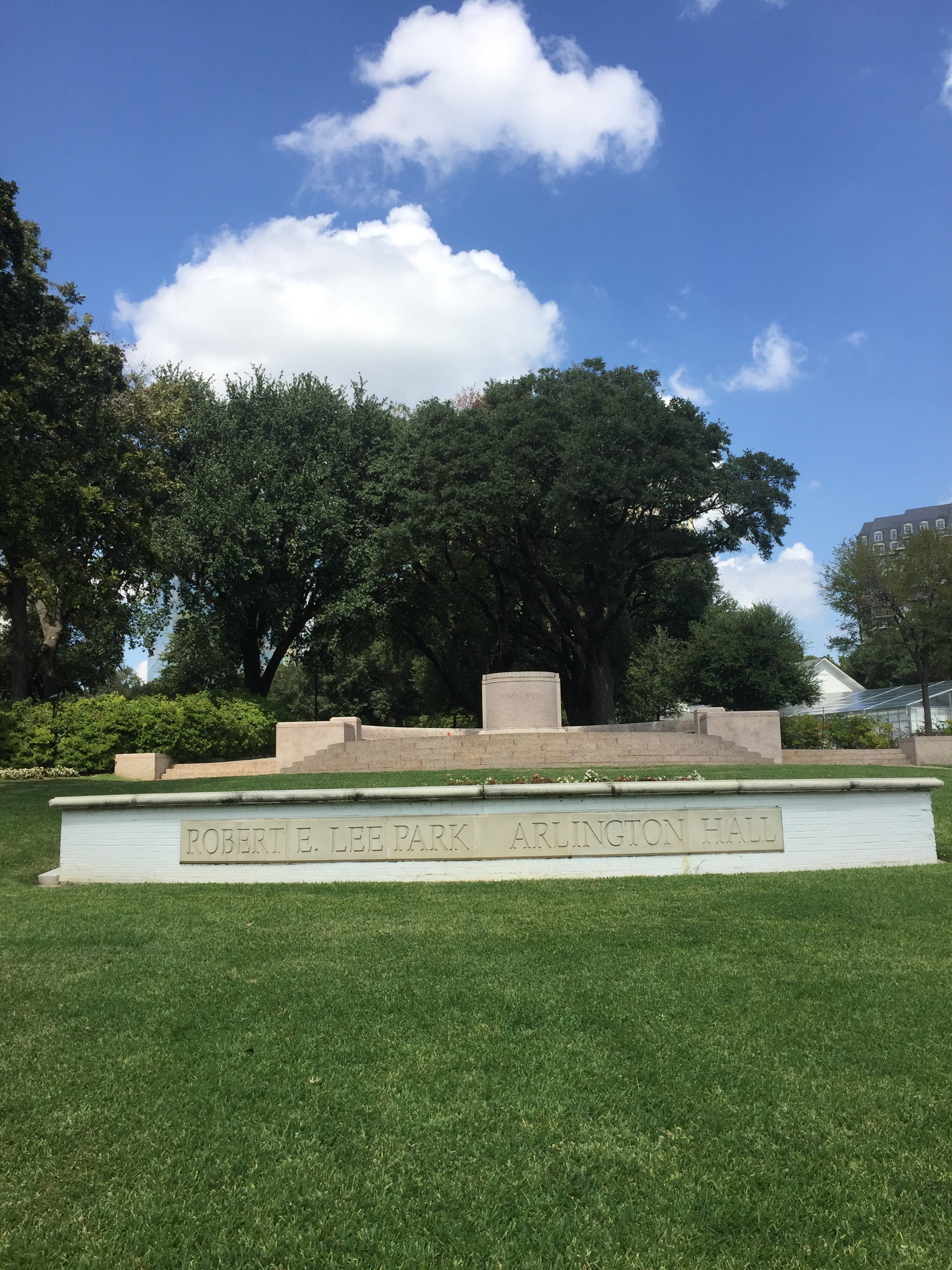
Empty plinth in 2017 after removal of statue. Since demolished.

The same year the statue was unveiled, Oak Lawn Park was renamed Robert E. Lee Park. The Dallas Morning News conducted an informal poll in 1987 to find the public's favorite statue in Dallas; Proctor's statue of General Lee came second after Robert Glen's Mustangs at Las Colinas. In 1991, the Dallas Southern Memorial Association spent $50,000 to restore the monument, which subsequently received a historical marker from the Texas Historical Commission. The statue was surveyed by the Smithsonian Institution's Save Outdoor Sculpture! program in 1992.

In July 2015, the statue was vandalized when someone painted the word "shame" across its base. The vandalism occurred concurrently with protests against Confederate monuments and memorials across the United States. The statue was removed in 2017 following the Unite the Right rally where white nationalists protested the planned removal of another statue of Lee; the rally resulted in the death of a woman at the hands of a suspected white nationalist. Dallas' city council voted to remove the statue, and the city's mayor viewed the statue as a symbol of injustice.

In 2019, the statue was put up for auction by the city of Dallas; money gained from the sale of the statue was to be used to fund the removal of Dallas' Confederate War Memorial. The starting bid for the auction was $450,000. The auction was won by Holmes Firm PC, a Dallas law firm which bid $1,435,000 on the statue. It was initially unclear if Holmes Firm PC purchased Robert E. Lee on Traveller for itself or on behalf of a client. According to the terms of sale, the statue cannot be displayed within Dallas city limits or be sold or given to someone who will display it within Dallas city limits. In September of the same year, the statue was installed at a golf course owned by Kelcy Warren in Terlingua, Texas, near the Mexican border crossing.

== See also ==
- 1936 in art
- List of memorials to Robert E. Lee

== Bibliography ==
- Gerem, Yves (2004), A Marmac Guide to Dallas, Gretna: Pelican Publishing Company, ISBN 1-58980-199-7
- Little, Carol Morris (1996), A Comprehensive Guide to Outdoor Sculpture in Texas, Austin: University of Texas Press, ISBN 0-292-76034-5
- Roosevelt, Franklin D. (1936), Public Papers of the Presidents of the United States: Franklin D. Roosevelt, 1936: Volume 5, Best Books on, ISBN 9781623769659
- John H. Slate and the Dallas Municipal Archives (2010), Historic Dallas Parks, United States of America: Arcadia Publishing, ISBN 978-0-7385-7891-0
