= Pioneer Plaza =

Large public park located in the Convention Center District of downtown Dallas, Texas

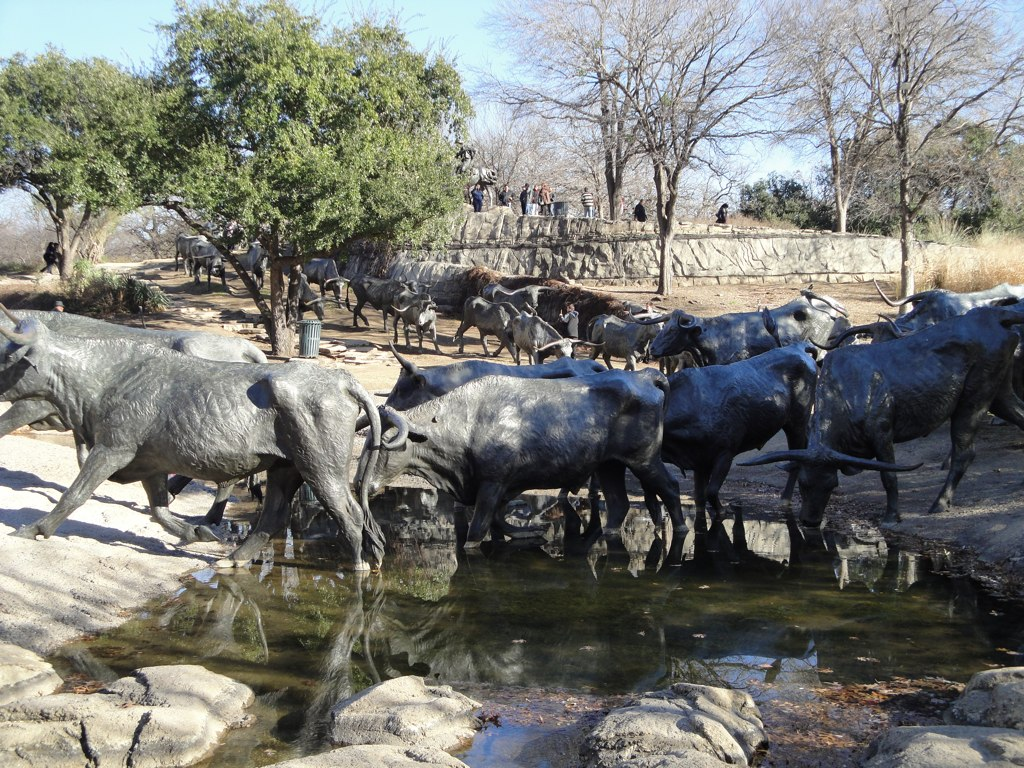
- Pioneer Plaza in 2010
- Interactive map of Pioneer Plaza
- Type: public park
- Location: Dallas, Texas
- Coordinates: 32°46′35″N 96°48′05″W
- Area: 4.2 acres (17,000 m^{2})
- Created: 1994
- Operator: City of Dallas
- Status: open all year

Pioneer Plaza is a large public park located in the Convention Center District of downtown Dallas, Texas (USA). It contains a large sculpture and is a heavily visited tourist site. Adjacent to the plaza is the Pioneer Park Cemetery which features the Confederate War Memorial. Together, it is the largest public open space in the Dallas central business district.

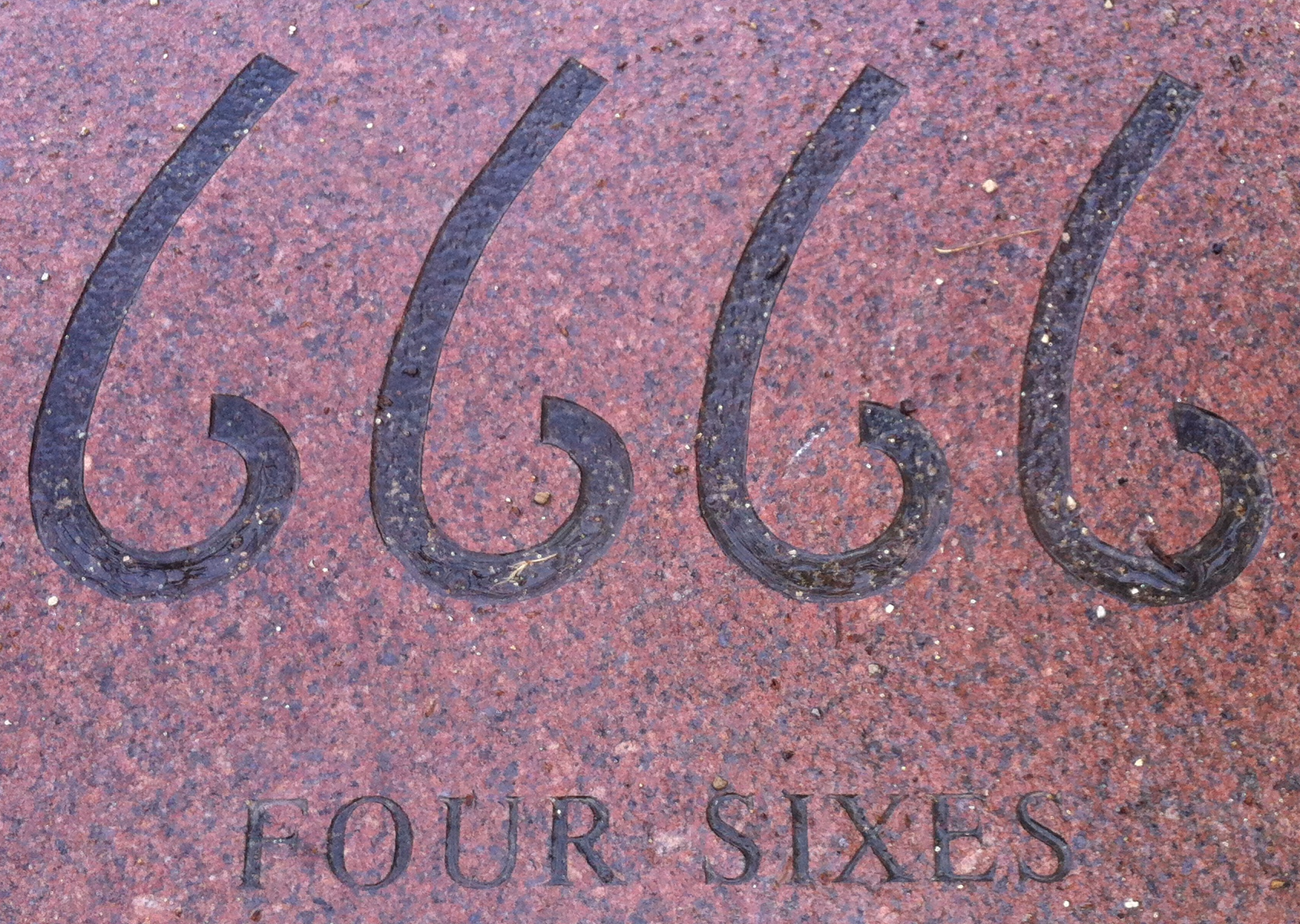
Historic brands from Texas ranches are depicted in the sidewalk on the west side, this one from the 6666 Ranch.

== History ==
The land on which the plaza sits, once railroad and warehouse property, was cleared for the 900-foot (270 m)-tall hotel and office Dallas Tower which was part of the failed Griffin Square development. The plaza and its accompanying sculpture were the idea of real estate developer Trammell Crow, who wanted an iconic "Western" sculpture in the city of Dallas and assembled a group to donate the sculptures. The $9 million project was begun in 1992 on 4.2 acres (17,000 m^{2}) of land donated by the City of Dallas; $4.8 million of the cost came from private funds raised from individuals and local businesses. Local artists sued to stop the project and claimed that it was historically inaccurate for the city, but the project opened on time in 1994

Today the park is maintained by the adjacent Dallas Convention Center and is the second most visited tourist attraction in downtown Dallas. As a work in progress, an additional steer is occasionally added to the herd.

== Sculpture ==
The large sculpture commemorates nineteenth century cattle drives that took place along the Shawnee Trail, the earliest and easternmost route by which Texas longhorn cattle were taken to northern railheads. The trail passed through Austin, Waco, and Dallas until the Chisolm Trail siphoned off most of the traffic in 1867. The 49 bronze steers and 3 trail riders sculptures were created by artist Robert Summers of Glen Rose, Texas. Each steer is larger-than-life at six feet high; all together the sculpture is the largest bronze monument of its kind in the world. Set along an artificial ridge and past a man-made limestone cliff, native landscaping with a flowing stream and waterfall help create the dramatic effect.
