= Veterans War Memorial of Texas =

Coordinates: 26.19917°N 98.25612°W

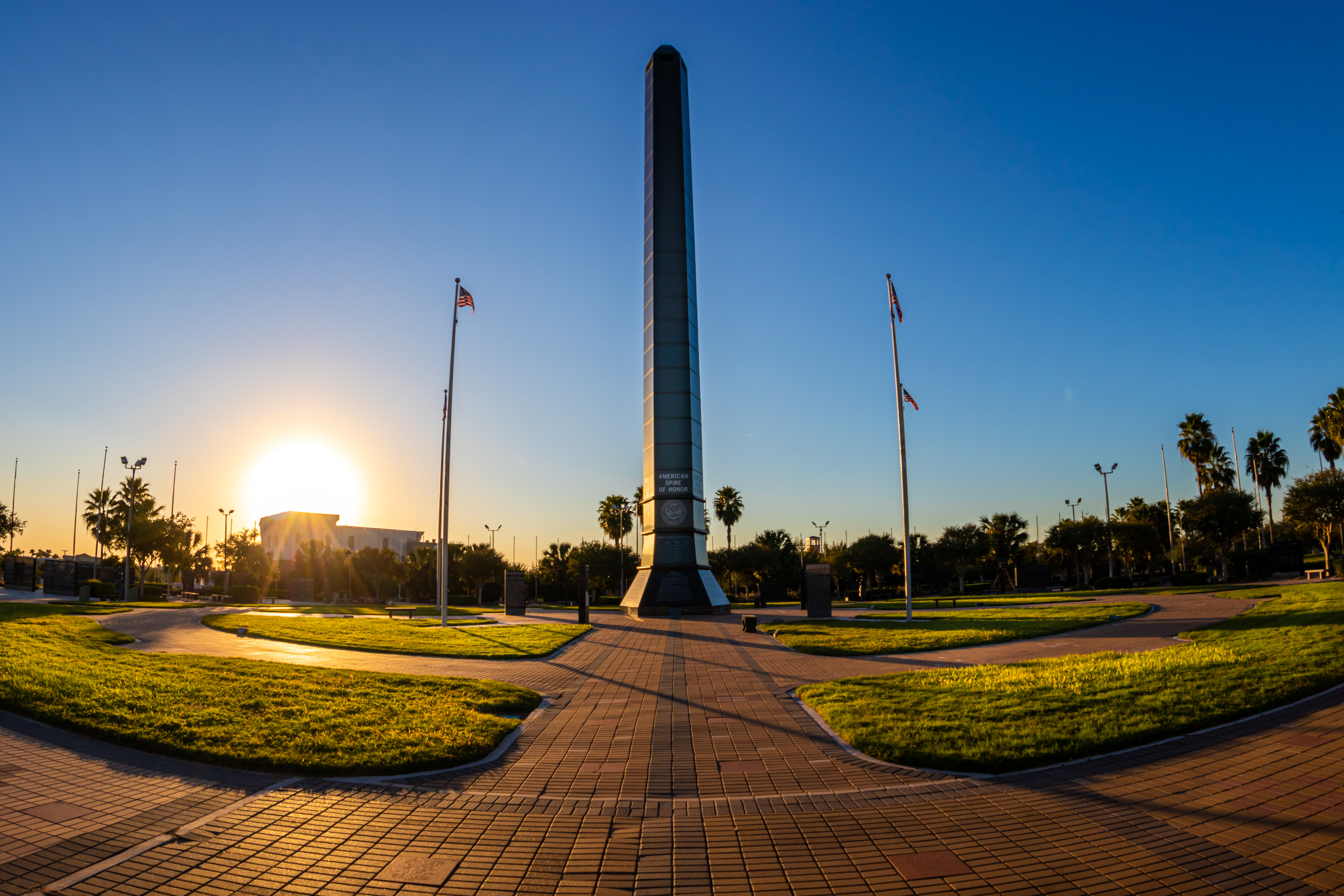
Veteran's War Memorial of Texas

The Veteran's War Memorial of Texas was established on Veteran's Day, 1990, to honor the 1.4 million Americans were killed or missing in action in all wars and conflicts of this nation. The Memorial site is located on a 3.5-acre (14,000 m^{2}) complex in McAllen, Texas at the intersection of 29th and Galveston Streets and is encircled by 5 war sites: World War I, World War II, Korean War, Vietnam War, The Gulf War & All Wars.

The site has 160 granite panels with stories containing historical information on each war, its citizenships and events of that time as well as a statue known as "The Warrior" which commemorates the 3,440 Medal of Honor recipients in the United States Armed Forces
