= List of Dallas–Fort Worth-area freeways =

DFW freeway map

The following is a list of the freeways and tollways in the Dallas/Fort Worth, Texas area:

== Interstates ==
Interstate 20; Ronald Reagan Memorial Highway; Lyndon B. Johnson Freeway	Interstate highway passing through the southern suburbs of Fort Worth, Arlington and sparsely populated south Dallas and its southern suburbs. The stretch of highway running along southern Tarrant County is known as the Ronald Reagan Memorial Highway. Throughout the majority of the city of Dallas it carries the name Lyndon B. Johnson Freeway, a name it shares with I-635, I-20 along with I-635 form a 3/4 loop around the city of Dallas and the suburbs. I-20 also completes a full loop around Fort Worth along with I-820.
Interstate 820; Jim Wright Freeway; Northeast Loop; Airport Freeway	Interstate loop around Fort Worth (the southern leg is now I-20). It is signed as the Jim Wright Freeway between Benbrook and Haltom City, the Northeast Loop from Haltom City to North Richland Hills, the Airport Freeway (multiplexed with SH 121) in North Richland Hills, and unnamed for the remainder of its journey. Jim Wright is the former Speaker of the U.S. House.
Interstate 30; West Freeway; Tom Landry Freeway; East R. L. Thornton Freeway	Interstate highway passing through Garland, Dallas, Grand Prairie, Arlington, and Fort Worth. It begins from I-20 just west of Fort Worth. Sometimes referred to by older residents as "the old Turnpike" since it previously was known as the Dallas-Fort Worth Turnpike. It is known as the West Freeway from I-20 to Downtown Fort Worth, the Tom Landry Freeway from Downtown Fort Worth to Downtown Dallas, and the East R. L. Thornton Freeway in Downtown and East Dallas. Tom Landry was the first head football coach of the Dallas Cowboys, leading the team for 29 years.
Interstate 35E; South R.L. Thornton Freeway; Stemmons Freeway	An Interstate highway passing through Dallas and Denton, it begins at I-35/I-35E in Denton (north of the Metroplex) and terminates with the same roads in Hillsboro (south of the Metroplex). I-35 is parallel or concurrent to US-77 for most of its route. It carries the South R. L. Thornton Freeway name south of Dallas and the Stemmons Freeway name north of Dallas.
Interstate 35W; South Freeway; North Freeway	Interstate highway passing through Fort Worth, terminates with I-35E/I-35 in Denton (north of the Metroplex) and Hillsboro (south of the Metroplex); it is known as the South Freeway south of I-30 and the North Freeway north of I-30.
Interstate 635; Lyndon B. Johnson Freeway	Interstate half-loop around Dallas. Begins at I-20 in Balch Springs and ends at the International Parkway near Dallas/Fort Worth International Airport.
Interstate 45; Julius Schepps Freeway	Interstate highway passing through sparsely populated southeast Dallas, terminating at the US 75/I-30 interchange in downtown Dallas; it is known throughout the central Dallas area as the Julius Schepps Freeway.
Interstate 345; North Central Expressway	The small section between I-30 and the Woodall Rodgers Freeway (SH 366) along the eastern edge of downtown Dallas is officially I-345, but is signed as "To US 75" (from the south) or "To I-45" (from the north).

== U.S. routes ==
U.S. Route 67; J. Elmer Weaver Freeway; S.G. Alexander Freeway; Marvin D. Love Freeway; R.L. Thornton Freeway; East R.L. Thornton Freeway	A freeway that begins in Midlothian and proceeds north towards Dallas. It is known as the J. Elmer Weaver Freeway in Cedar Hill, but quickly changes names to the S. G. Alexander Freeway in Duncanville. After its interchange with I-20, it changes names again to the Marvin D. Love Freeway. In Cedar Crest, it becomes multiplexed with I-35E and US 77, becoming the South R.L. Thornton Freeway. In Downtown Dallas, US 67 leaves to become multiplexed with I-30 (the East R.L. Thornton Freeway). The two stay concurrent until Hopkins County.
U.S. Route 75; North Central Expressway	US 75 begins in Downtown Dallas at an interchange with the Woodall Rodgers Freeway and I-345, I-345 being an unsigned interstate leading to I-45. It proceeds north as the North Central Expressway through the most popular and affluent neighborhoods of Downtown Dallas. SH 121 is concurrent with US 75 in McKinney. Past McKinney, the highway continues north through rural areas towards northern Texas.
U.S. Route 77; Dallas Highway; R.L. Thornton Freeway; Stemmons Freeway	A north-south freeway that is concurrent with I-35E, the R.L. Thornton Freeway and the Stemmons Freeway, (and is also multiplexed with US 67 for parts) between Red Oak and Denton. The freeway is in a trench for 6 miles (10 km).
U.S. Route 80	US 80 is freeway passing through Mesquite, beginning at I-30 in East Dallas. The freeway ends at Spur 557, but the U.S. highway continues east as Moore Avenue. US 80 formerly passed through Fort Worth, towards El Paso before being replaced by I-20.
U.S. Route 175; S.M. Wright Freeway; C.F. Hawn Freeway	US 175 begins at an interchange with I-45 in Downtown Dallas, proceeding south to an interchange with SH 310 (the South Central Expressway), and then continuing east towards Kaufman, now known as the C.F. Hawn Freeway. The freeway terminates just past Kaufman, but US 175 continues as a smaller highway.
U.S. Route 287; Martin Luther King Jr. Freeway	Freeway passing through southeast Fort Worth, southwest Arlington, and Mansfield. The freeway begins in Downtown Fort Worth and proceeds southeast away from Fort Worth. Part of the freeway is multiplexed with I-820 and I-20.

== State highways ==
State Highway 114; John W. Carpenter Freeway	Freeway passing through Southlake, Grapevine, the DFW airport, the Las Colinas business district in Irving, and heading into Dallas before merging with SH 183.
State Highway 121; Airport Freeway	Freeway passing through Grapevine and northeast Fort Worth. See below for information on the tolled stretch of 121, which extends from Grapevine to US 75.
State Highway 161	Freeway/tollway passing between Dallas/Fort Worth International Airport and Irving, will eventually connect to State Highway 190 on the north, with plans to extend south to Interstate 20. Part of the President George Bush Turnpike (see below).
State Highway 170; Alliance Gateway Freeway	Freeway running from Interstate 35W in northern Fort Worth, connecting with Highway 114 in Westlake.
State Highway 183; Airport Freeway; John W. Carpenter Freeway; Southwest Boulevard	Freeway passing through Irving and the "Mid-Cities", a 3 miles (5 km) section of State Highway 183 in southwest Fort Worth is a freeway.
State Highway 190	Originally planned as the designation for a northern outer-loop freeway, but a tollway was built instead and State Highway 190 was retained as the designation of the frontage roads of the President George Bush Turnpike (see below).
State Highway 310; S. M. Wright Freeway	Freeway in South Dallas parallel to I-45. Covering 3 miles (5 km) the remnants of the old Central Expressway, SH 310 starts at US 175 as a freeway and continues as a smaller highway to I-45 near the interchange with I-20 in Hutchins.
State Highway 360; Angus G. Wynne Freeway; Watson Road	A freeway passing relatively along the border of Arlington and Grand Prairie, also named after the founder of Six Flags Over Texas, which SH 360 passes by.

=== Loops ===
Loop 12; Walton Walker Boulevard	A freeway passing through west Dallas and Irving, connecting to Spur 408 in the south, and connecting to I-35E in Dallas, it also passed by Texas Stadium when this article was written over a decade ago.
Loop 288	A freeway passing through north Denton, connecting to I-35 on the north, freeway terminates at US 380/377 and continues as an expressway to I-35E. Together both sections bypass the central business district. Future plans call for an extensions west to US 380 before continuing south to I-35W.

=== Spurs ===
Spur 97; International Parkway (part)	Part of the International Parkway, a tollway passing through Dallas/Fort Worth International Airport.
Spur 280	A brief spur freeway connecting US 287 to downtown Fort Worth.
Spur 347; Belknap Street; Weatherford Street	A short spur freeway from the SH 121 / I-35W interchange into downtown Fort Worth.
Spur 366; Woodall Rodgers Freeway	A freeway passing along the northern boundary of downtown Dallas. Originally connected I-35E to US 75/I-345, now extended across the Margaret Hunt Hill Bridge to Singleton Blvd. in west Dallas.
Spur 399; Sam Rayburn Tollway (part)	A short spur freeway traveling from SH 121-Central Expressway (US 75) interchange to SH 5 south of downtown McKinney. Soon to become part of Sam Rayburn Tollway.
Spur 408; Patriot Parkway	A freeway passing through semi-rural southwest Dallas, connecting to Loop 12 on the north and terminating at I-20 in the south.
Spur 482; Storey Lane	A spur freeway connecting SH 183/114 to Loop 12 (Northwest Highway), passes by former site of Texas Stadium.

== Tollways ==
Dallas North Tollway (DNT)	A tollway extending northward out of downtown Dallas and passing along and through most affluent neighborhoods and shopping/dining areas in Dallas, passing through Plano, and into Frisco. Its free frontage roads (which don't exist south of I-635) are known as the Dallas Parkway. The Tollway currently extends to the northern edge of Frisco, terminating at U.S. Highway 380, and is under construction to extend it farther north.
International Parkway	The International Parkway is a tolled road that passes from SH 121 in Euless to the southern end of the Sam Rayburn Tollway, passing through DFW Airport. It is only tolled within the DFW airport grounds.
President George Bush Turnpike (PGBT)	A tollway named for former president George H. W. Bush; passes through northern Dallas suburbs, currently terminating at State Highway 161 in Irving in the west and at I-30 in the east, forming a northern loop around Dallas. In between, it forms the boundary between Plano to the north and Dallas and Richardson to the south. The Turnpike's free frontage roads are signed as State Highway 190.
Sam Rayburn Tollway (SRT)	A tollway beginning at the northern end of the International Parkway in Grapevine and proceeding northeast to just south of McKinney. The tollway's free frontage roads are signed as State Highway 121.
Chisholm Trail Parkway (CTP)	A tollway beginning in Tarrant and Johnson counties connecting the central business district of the city of Fort Worth at Interstate 30 to US 67 in Cleburne.
360 Tollway	The tolled portion of State Highway 360 beginning at I-20 in southern Arlington and ending at US 287 in Mansfield

== Gallery ==
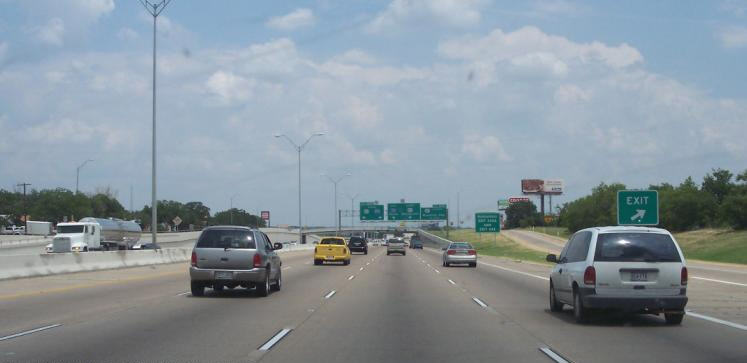
I-20 Ronald Reagan Memorial Highway in southern Fort Worth

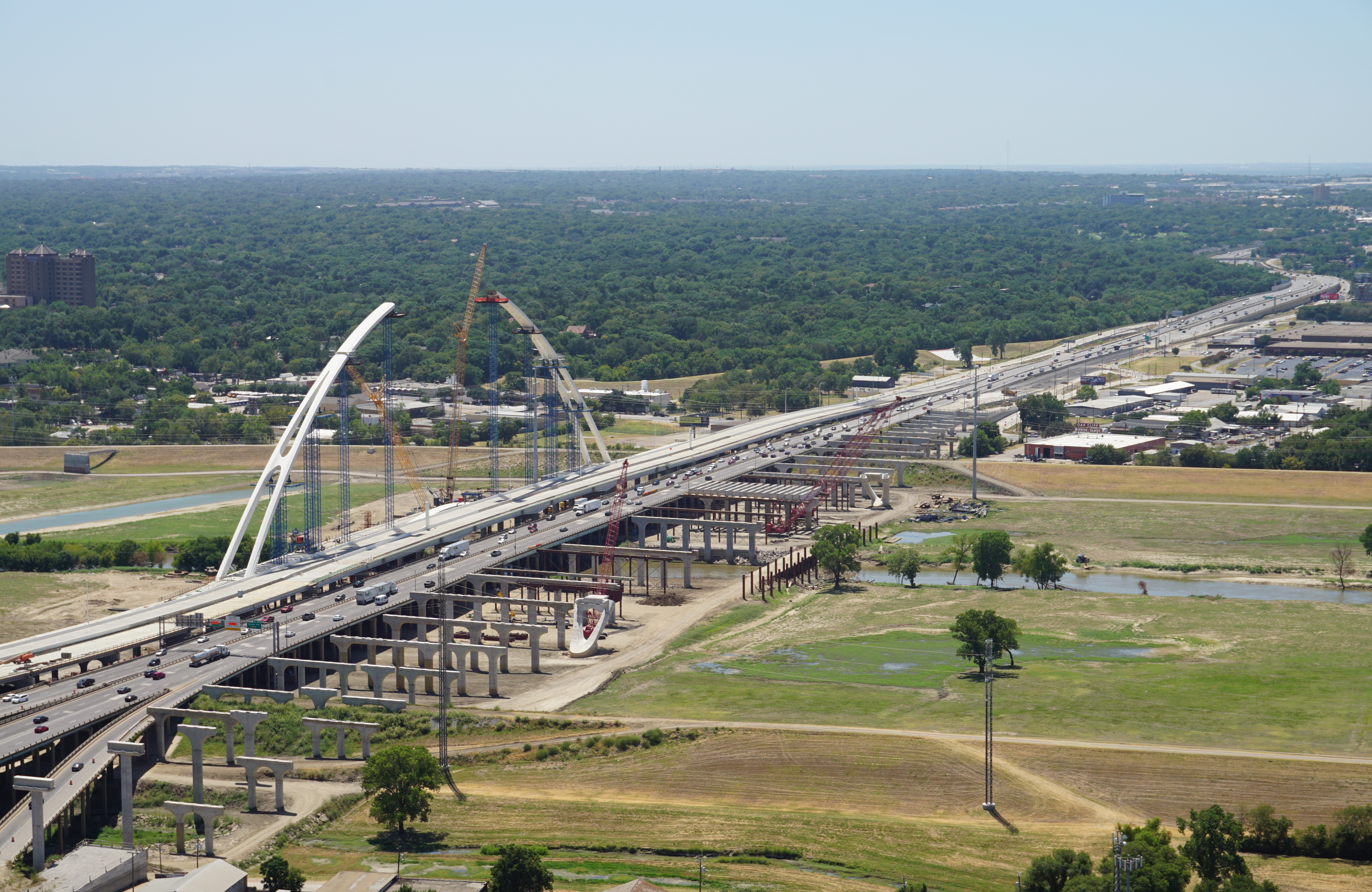
I-30 Tom Landry Highway as viewed from Reunion Tower in downtown Dallas

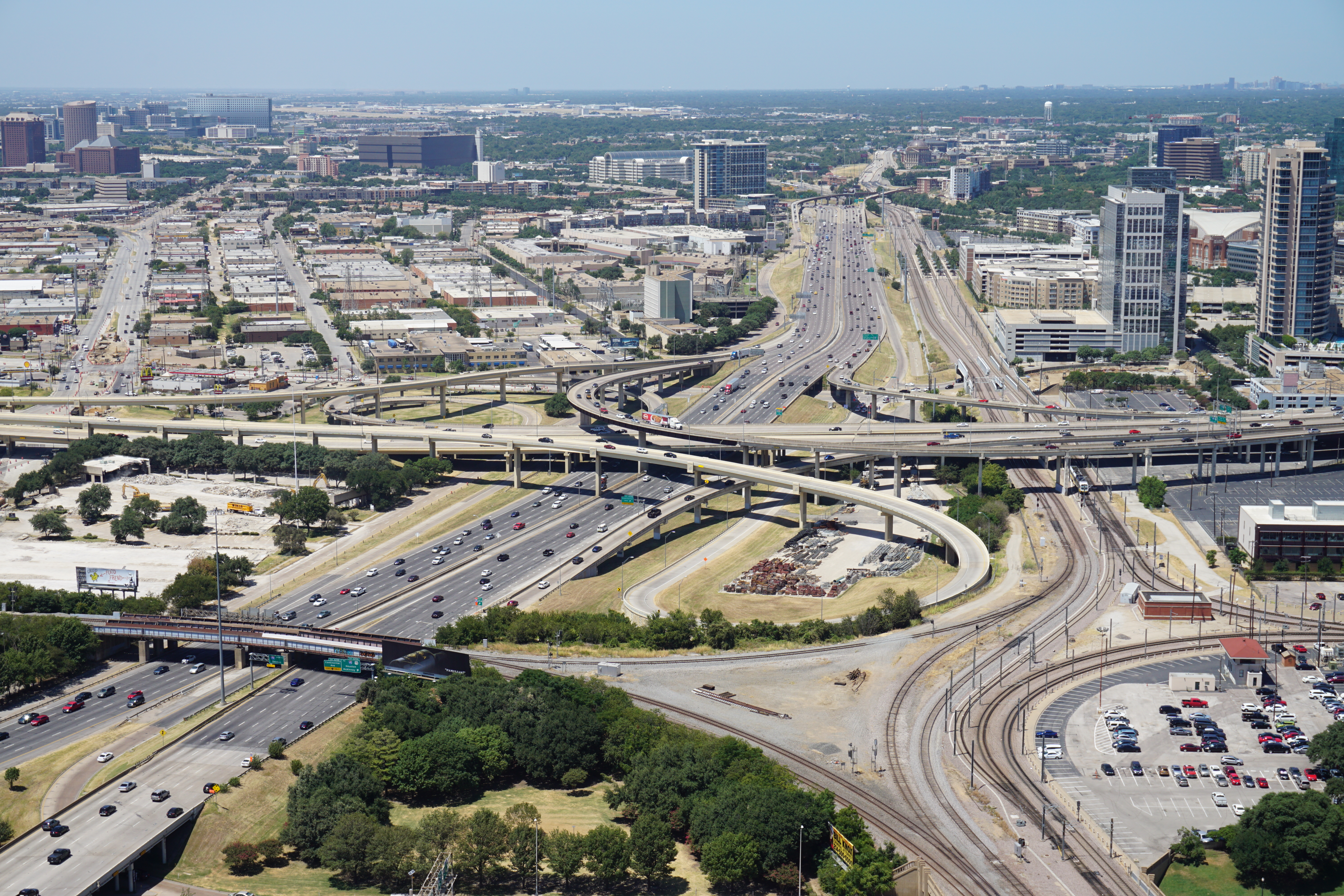
I-35E interchange with Spur 366

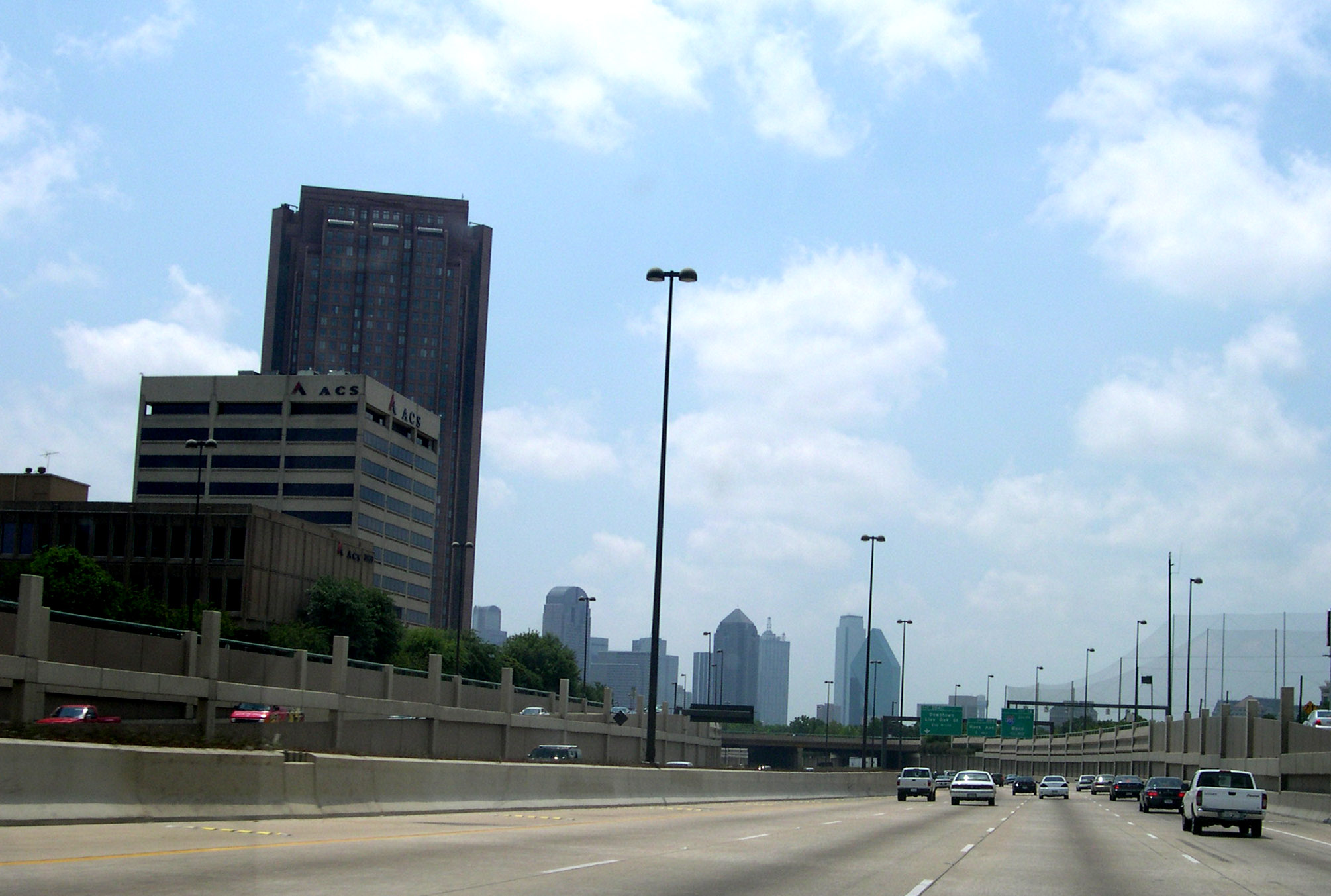
US 75 Central Expressway at Haskell Avenue

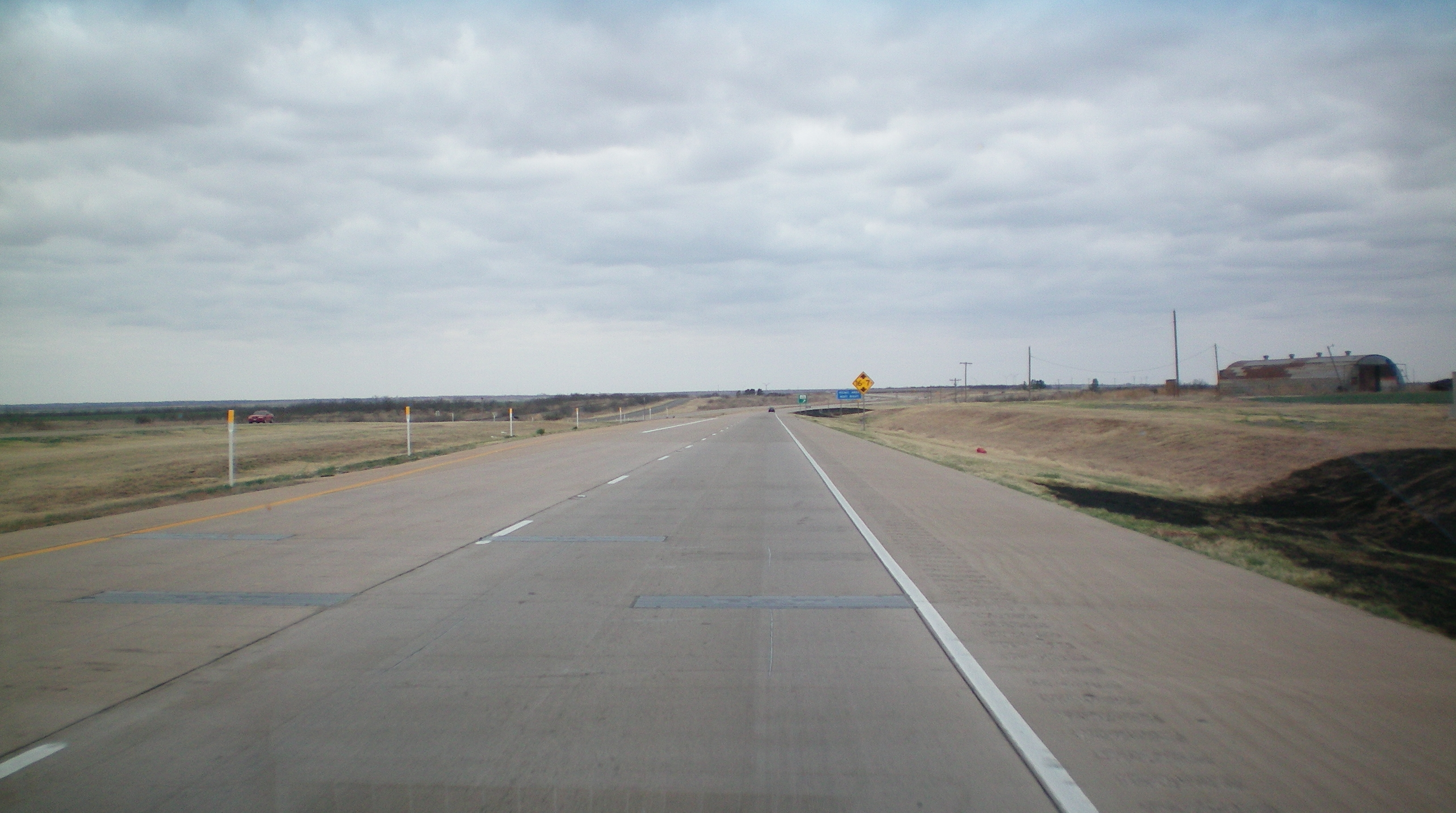
U.S. Route 287 in North Texas

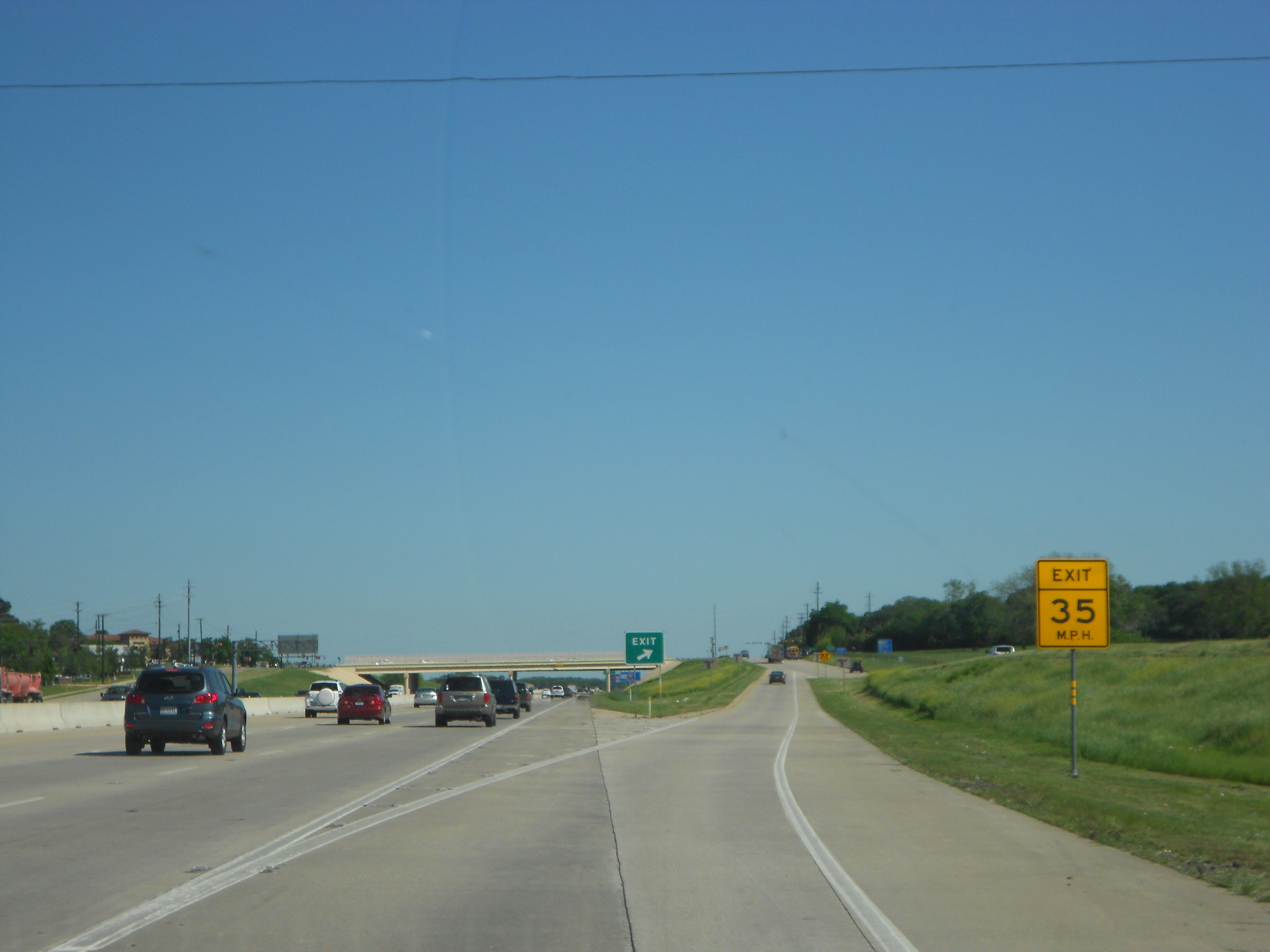
State Highway 114 in Southlake

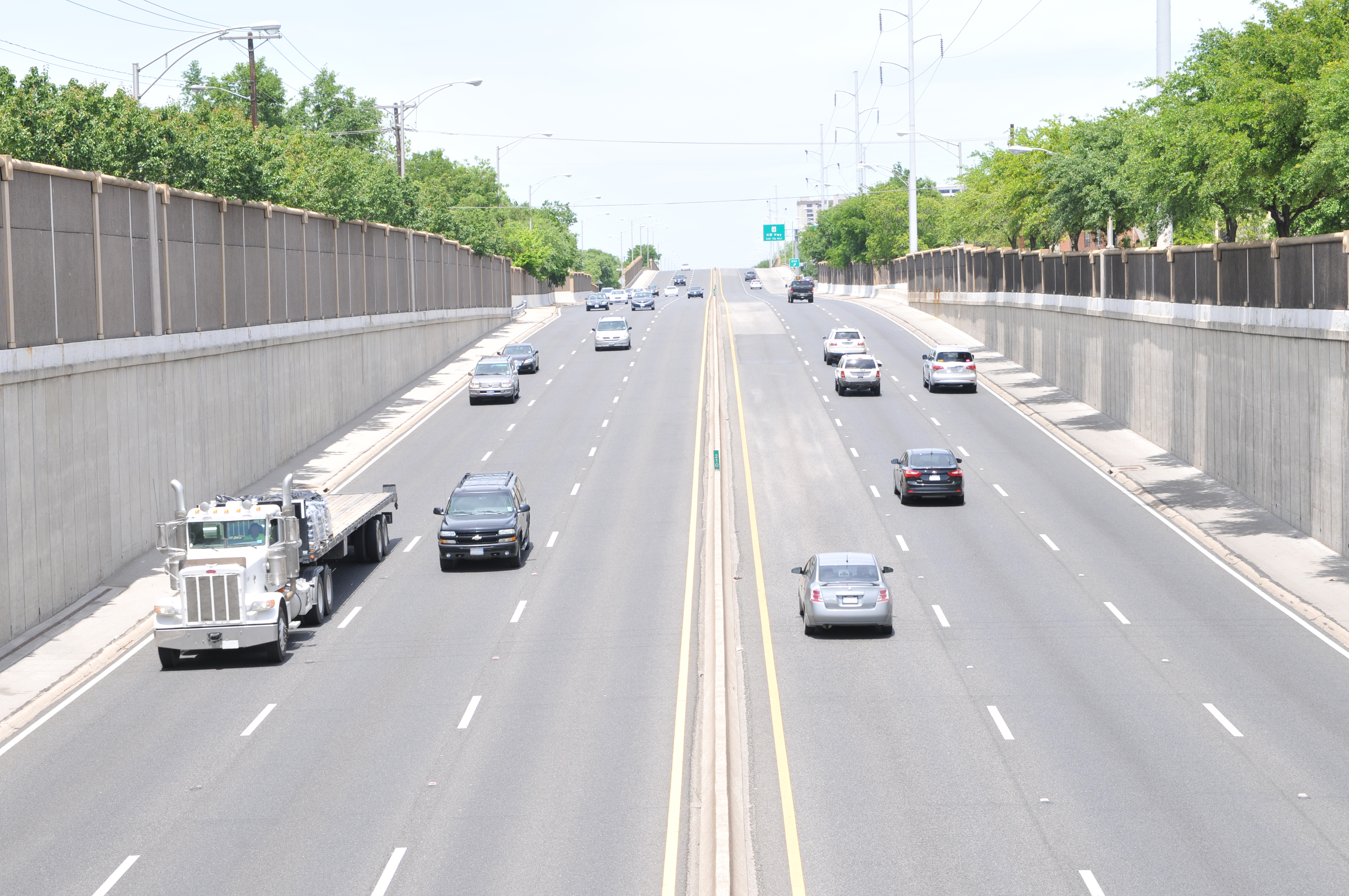
Dallas North Tollway facing north from the University Boulevard overpass

== See also ==
- Texas state highways
