= Libraries in Dallas =

Dallas is a city in Texas, United States.

== Dallas Public Library ==
The city of Dallas is served by the Dallas Public Library system. The system was originally created by the Dallas Federation of Women's Clubs with efforts spearheaded by then-president Mrs. Henry (May Dickson) Exall. Her work in raising money led to a grant from philanthropist and steel baron Andrew Carnegie, which enabled the construction of the first branch in 1901. Today the library operates 25 branch locations throughout the city including the J. Erik Jonsson Central Library, the eight-story main branch in the Government District of downtown.

=== Branches ===
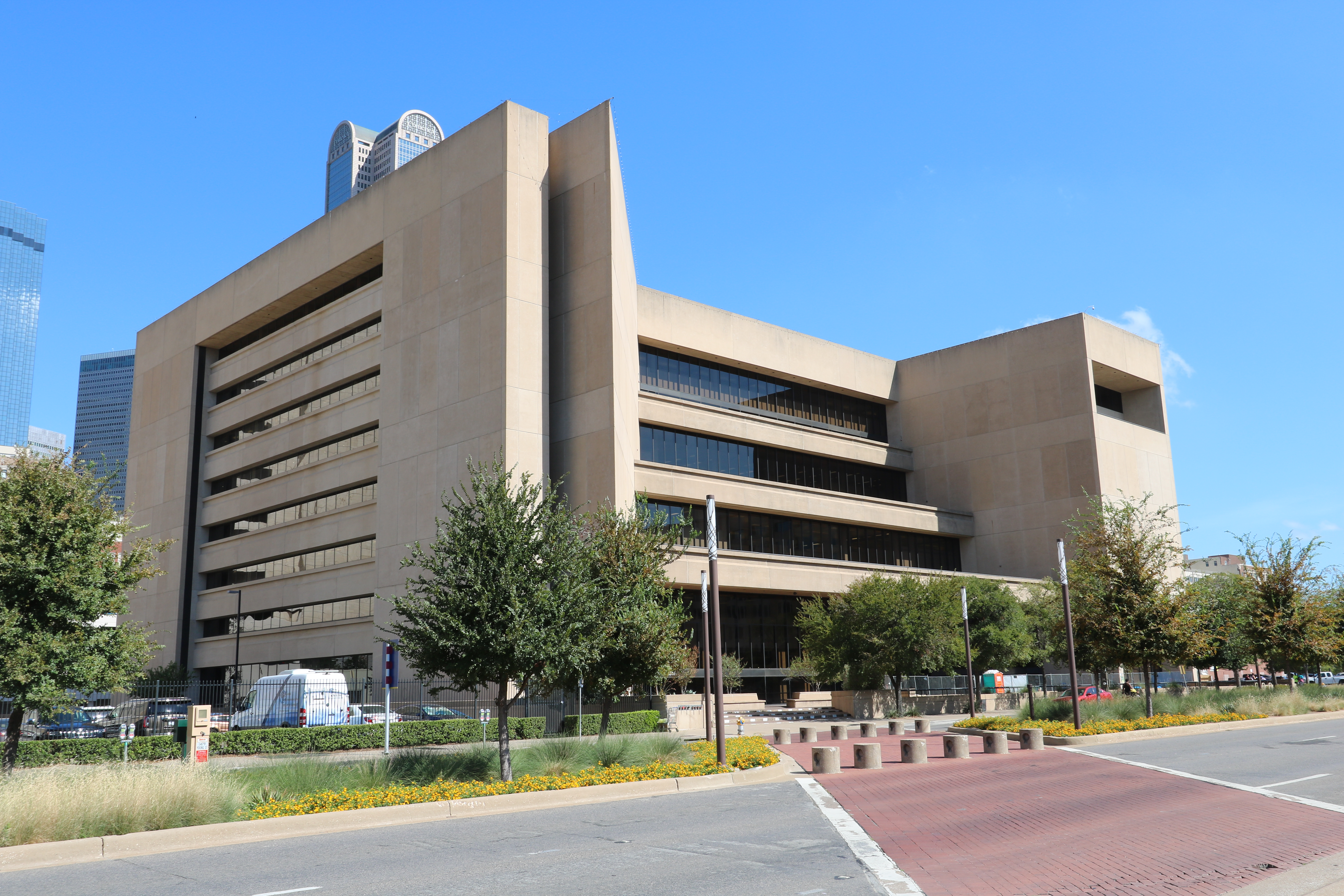
The J. Erik Jonsson Central Library, in downtown Dallas, TX

- Arcadia Park Branch Library in West Dallas
- Audelia Road Branch Library in Lake Highlands
- Bachman Lake Library in North Dallas
- Casa View Branch Library in the Casa Linda neighborhood of east Dallas
- Dallas West Branch Library in West Dallas
- Forest Green Branch Library in Lake Highlands
- Fretz Park Branch Library in North Dallas
- Grauwyler Park Branch Library in Dallas
- Hampton-Illinois Branch Library in Oak Cliff
- Highland Hills Branch Library in the Highland Hills neighborhood of South Dallas
- Kleberg-Rylie Branch Library in far Southeast Dallas
- Lakewood Branch Library in Lakewood
- Martin Luther King Jr. Library and Learning Center near Fair Park
- Mountain Creek Branch Library in Mountain Creek, Dallas, Texas|Mountain Creek
- North Oak Cliff Branch Library in Oak Cliff
- Oak Lawn Branch Library in Oak Lawn
- Park Forest Branch Library in North Dallas
- Paul Laurence Dunbar Lancaster-Kiest Branch Library in South Dallas
- Pleasant Grove Branch Library in Pleasant Grove
- Polk-Wisdom Branch Library in Southwest Dallas
- Preston Royal Branch Library in North Dallas
- Renner Frankford Branch Library in Far North Dallas
- Skillman Southwestern Branch Library in East Dallas
- Skyline Branch Library in East Dallas
- Timberglen Branch Library in Far North Dallas

== UT Southwestern Medical Library ==
The University of Texas Southwestern Medical Center in the Stemmons Corridor operates a library across two branches on its north and south campuses. The library holds 259,000 volumes in all formats, including 86,000 books and 54,000 full-text electronic journals.

== See also ==
- List of libraries in the United States
