= Everette Lee DeGolyer =

American oil executive, geophysicist, and philanthropist

- DeGolyer in 1913 at Potrero del Llano
- Born: October 9, 1886; Greensburg, Kansas
- Died: December 14, 1956 (aged 70); Dallas, Texas
- Education: BS Geology, University of Oklahoma, 1911; Six honorary degrees
- Occupations: Petroleum geologist, geophysicist
- Known for: Advancement of Geophysical methods to find oil
- Spouse: Nell Virginia Goodrich
- Children: 4
- Awards: Lucas Medal (1941); John Fritz Medal (1942); Sydney Powers Award (1950); DeGolyer Distinguished Service Medal(1956)

Everette Lee DeGolyer (October 9, 1886 – December 14, 1956), was a prominent oil company executive, petroleum exploration geophysicist and philanthropist in Dallas. He was known as "the founder of applied geophysics in the petroleum industry", and as "the father of American geophysics," and was a legendary collector of rare and often early edition books primarily in the fields of Southwestern history, railroads, law, geology, science and physics, and both English and American literature.

== Early life ==
DeGolyer was born in a sod house on October 9, 1886, the son of John and Narcissa Kagy Huddle DeGolyer of Greensburg, Kansas. He was the eldest of three children. The family moved to Joplin, Missouri, where Everette attended school while his father worked in lead and zinc mining. In 1901 the family moved to Norman, Oklahoma, where Everette attended the University of Oklahoma preparatory school. He became a degree student at the University of Oklahoma beginning in the fall of 1905.

During the summers of 1906 through 1909, he worked for the United States Geological Survey (USGS) starting as a cook and working up to field assistant. A major responsibility of the USGS was making topographical maps and identifying the location of coal and lignite deposits in Colorado, Wyoming, and Montana. While working for the USGS, he reported to Willard Hayes, a Ph.D. in geology, who was instrumental in hiring DeGolyer as a field geologist for Mexican Eagle Oil in 1909.

=== Mexican Eagle ===
In early 1910, DeGolyer began work as a field geologist for the Mexican Eagle Petroleum Company (El Aguila Oil Company), remaining with the company primarily in Mexico through the Spring of 1914. While there, he was involved in the discoveries of the Potrero del Llano well No. 4 which came in as a gusher on December 27, 1910, at a depth of 1911 feet, and the heavily producing Las Naranjos field to the West around 1911. Producing approximately 130,000,000 barrels of oil in its eight years of operation, Potrero de Llano No. 4 established DeGolyer's early reputation, and slowly began to enhance the perceived value of geologists in the success of the petroleum industry, as it became the most productive well in the history of Mexican petroleum mining, and the most productive well in the Western Hemisphere for that period.

Around eight months after beginning his work at Mexican Eagle Oil, DeGolyer married Nell Virginia Goodrich, then a teaching assistant and graduate of the University of Oklahoma, at 8:00 am on the morning of June 10, 1910, at her home in Norman, Oklahoma, then returned with her to live briefly first in Tuxpan and later in Tampico, Mexico, around 30 miles North of his strike at Potrero del Llano. After his strike at Potrero, with strong support and encouragement from his wife Nell, who had formerly completed degrees there in Music and Philosophy, DeGolyer took a leave of absence to return to the University of Oklahoma to finish his A.B. degree in geology in early 1911. Completing his degree that summer, his bachelor's thesis addressed what he had learned surveying anthracite deposits in Colorado.

== Oil career ==
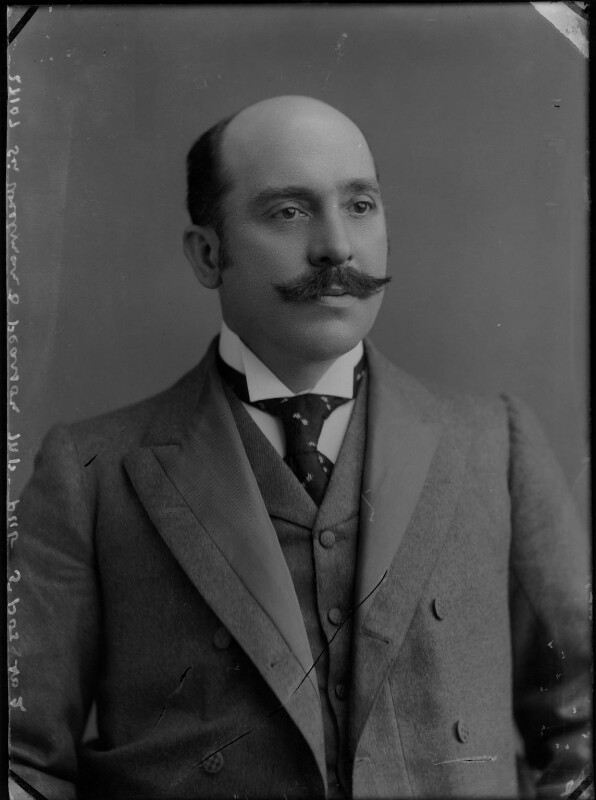
Business mentor, Weetman Pearson, Lord Cowdray

After leaving Mexico in 1914 due to American hostilities towards the Mexican government, DeGolyer took his first trip to Europe with his wife, meeting Weetman Pearson, his boss at Mexican Eagle Oil, in London. At the outbreak of World War I in August 1914, he was forced to leave Europe, unable to book a train to Spain as rail service had been discontinued.

Traveling for Mexican Eagle Oil around 1915, he spent time prospecting oil provinces in Cuba including Havana and Pino Del Rio, and concluded that though oil could be found in Cuba, the probability of finding great oil fields on the Island was not good. He moved to Montclair, New Jersey, to work in New York City in 1916 as an independent consultant, but primarily still functioning as a manager for Mexican Eagle Oil. In 1919, while working as a consultant to British entrepreneur Lord Cowdray, formerly known as Sir Weetman Pearson, an executive and part owner of Mexican Eagle Oil, DeGolyer negotiated the sale of the El Aguila (Mexican Eagle Oil Company) company to Royal Dutch Shell. At the time, Mexican Eagle was valued at roughly $100 million. As predicted by DeGolyer, many of the remaining Mexican Eagle wells would be greatly depleted of oil in the remaining years.

=== Torsion balance method ===
As a geophysical consultant with the Rycade Corporation, he made the first torsion balance survey in the United States at the highly productive Spindletop oilfield, near Beaumont in South Texas. An oilfield found by DeGolyer on behalf of Rycade in Southeast Texas's Nash salt dome was considered the first anywhere to be discovered using geophysics. The strike, on the flank of a salt dome in Texas's Southern Fort Bend, occurred on January 3, 1926, using the torsion balance method which utilized gravity to identify and map layers of underground rock strata, while roughly approximating their size, depth, and density. The Nash salt dome was first surveyed around February–March 1924.

=== Seismographic refraction ===
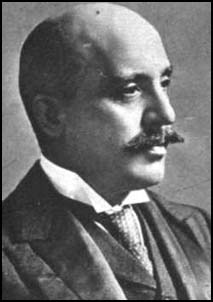
Weetman Pearson

In 1920, DeGolyer organized the formation of the Amerada Petroleum Corporation (1920) for Lord Cowdray, rising to become general manager, president, and chairman from 1929 to 1932. In May 1925, DeGolyer helped to organize the oil exploration company Geophysical Research Corporation (GRC) as a subsidiary of the Rycade and Amerada Oil Companies. Geophysical Research Corporation would have offices in Bloomfield, two miles from DeGolyer's home in Montclaire.

After DeGolyer hired Dr. John Clarence Karcher, GRC would act as a development lab for the refraction and reflection seismograph, under the direction of Karcher, who held the primary patents for the device. Karcher, who already held patents in reflection seismography, would hire an electrical engineer and physicist Eugene McDermott, and a staff of geophysicists who would use and continue to develop the seismograph to discover oil deposits. Between 1927 and 1932, under the leadership of DeGolyer on behalf of Rycade, the company found eleven new salt domes using seismographic refraction surveys. The seismographic refraction method attempted to plot and identify the composition of underground rock strata primarily by measuring the speed with which sound waves passed through them. The density of the rock strata and their distance from the surface could be approximated as well. DeGolyer was able to effectively locate salt domes with adjacent oil deposits using this method, aided by the fact that salt domes were considerably less heavy and dense than the rock strata that surrounded them, so sound waves passed through them quickly. DeGolyer left Amerada in 1932, but remained with Rycade, which was established to explore salt dome oil deposits through 1941.

=== Reflection seismology ===
In 1930, while working for Amerada, but already active in the formation of Geophysical Service Inc., using the new reflection seismology method he diagnosed a well location in Oklahoma's Seminole Plateau, then known as Edwards Field, which drilled at a depth of 4,216 feet, would initially produce 8000 barrels a day. The reflection technique used a controlled explosion of dynamite to aim sound waves at underground geological structures, using sensors at the surface to record the return speed of both the reflected waves and those that passed through the rock structures. The method mapped the geologic structures, often focusing on a subterranean dome, more accurately than both the more difficult-to-interpret torsion balance method or the former seismic refraction method which had proven effective in locating salt domes with adjacent petroleum deposits but was less effective in finding actual pools of oil.

One source considered the Oklahoma well in Edward's Field, "the most important well drilled in America since Spindletop", and noted that after its discovery, as much as half of all wells found after that time would be found using reflection seismology. The use of the method eventually led to roughly one out of six wells striking oil, in contrast to former methods producing closer to one out of ten. DeGolyer left the Geophysical Research Corporation (GRC) which focused on reflection seismology techniques originated by J. Clarence Karcher and Eugene McDermott in 1932 to move to Dallas, Texas, where both Karcher and McDermott would follow him. He moved to be with his new company Geophysical Service Inc., founded in 1930, headquartered in Dallas, and to be closer to the oil fields of Texas, Oklahoma, and Louisiana. Karcher would serve as the first president, with McDermott as vice-president.

=== GSI and other ventures ===
DeGolyer provided financial support for the 1930 establishment of GRC's successor, Geophysical Service Incorporated (GSI) which would make more extensive use of the superior reflection seismology method of detection. DeGolyer would acquire a fifty percent interest in GSI, which he would purchase for $100,000, though as he had yet to leave the board of Geophysical Research Corporation and Amerada, he did not initially fully divulge his involvement, and his part ownership was held in co-founder J.C. Karcher's name. Eugene McDermott, another former co-worker of DeGolyer's, was the other company founder. DeGolyer had been hoping to expand the scope of the Geophysical Research Corporation beyond its work with Amerada Oil, which largely focused on the American oil market in the Southwest when he decided to invest in Geophysical Service Inc. (GSI), a company he hoped could have a broader American domestic, and possibly international scope.

==== Texas Instruments ====
In 1951, GSI would become a subsidiary of the newly formed, highly successful electronics company Texas Instruments, which had its beginning providing oil exploration services and producing seismographic oil exploration and sonar equipment as GSI. Under the leadership of DeGolyer's former coworker Eugene McDermott, who would serve first as president and then as a director from 1951 to 1973, and John Clarence Karcher as vice-president, Texas Instruments would eventually become the largest high technology employer in the Dallas area and one of the world's largest semiconductor manufacturers, but DeGoyler had divested his shares in GSI by that time.

In 1936 with Lewis MacNaughton, DeGolyer established the petroleum exploration consulting firm DeGolyer and MacNaughton and Core Laboratories to provide drilling core and fluids analysis. In January 1937, based on data from seismographic reflection, DeGolyer drilled a well near Patoka, Illinois which immediately produced 1,500 barrels a day. DeGolyer was also associated with the Atlatl Royalty Company from 1932 to 1950 and another oil company, the Felmont Corporation in 1934, which had more limited success. Felmont, in which he co-invested with banker and New Jersey neighbor Walter Case "never succeeded in finding the elephant oilfields that DeGolyer hoped", and he let the company go in 1939. In 1956 he established Isotopes, Incorporated to provide radioactive isotopes for oilfield and industrial purposes.

=== Government service ===
==== Petroleum Administration ====
During World War II, DeGolyer served as director of conservation with the Office of the Coordinator for National Defense from 1941 to 1942. He was assistant deputy of the Petroleum Administration for War in 1942–43.

==== Petroleum Reserves Corp ====
DeGolyer was in charge of the Petroleum Reserves Corporation (PRC) mission to the Middle East in 1943 and 1944. Though he had known by 1940 that the Middle East would become the most critical area for petroleum production within twenty years, in the preliminary report he prepared for the Petroleum Reserves Corporation in February 1944, he wrote, "The center of gravity of world oil production is shifting from the Gulf-Caribbean area to the Middle-East-to the Persian Gulf Area-and is likely to continue to shift until it is firmly established in that area."

==== Building reserves ====
During this period, DeGolyer backed a proposal by PRC officer Harold L. Ickes that advocated spending $120 million of Federal funds to build a pipeline to send Kuwaiti and Saudi oil to the Mediterranean Sea for shipment. In exchange, the oil companies would "create a one billion barrel oil reserve that the United States military could purchase at a 25% discount from the market price", but the proposal ultimately failed due to opposition from American domestic oil companies, particularly smaller ones, that likely feared it would reduce the markets for their product and that the pipeline would require the American military to protect it. Small domestic oil producers criticized the plan as a "move toward fascism".

During the Cold War, DeGolyer continued to stress the advantages of creating an oil reserve for the United States by increasing the purchase of foreign oil, but support for his position was blunted by domestic oil producers who most likely feared it would diminish the market for their product. Though in 1948, following a trend DeGolyer had predicted, the United States imported more petroleum than it exported, President Dwight D. Eisenhower in March 1959, with reluctance announced the requirement for restrictive quotas on oil imports into the United States, a move that ended DeGolyer's hopes of building a domestic reserve from imports. Though Eisenhower's initiation of quotas protected American oil producers, it also had the effect of more rapidly depleting domestic oil reserves rather than foreign sources, and on later reflection could be viewed as short-sighted in several respects.

==== Work with AEC ====
In 1948, under President Truman, he was made a member of the advisory committee on raw materials for the United States Atomic Energy Commission.

=== Professional society roles ===
2020 Logo

He was president of the American Institute of Mining and Metallurgical Engineers in 1927, and was a director of the American Petroleum Institute for twenty years.

== Other ventures ==
In non-petroleum-related activities, DeGolyer was active in publishing, where he had a controlling interest and was chairman of the editorial board of the Saturday Review of Literature. DeGolyer was also associate editor of New Colophon and the Southwest Review. A regent of the Smithsonian Institution, he was also a distinguished professor of geology at the University of Texas at Austin in 1940 and held seven honorary doctorates.

DeGolyer served on numerous boards of directors, including the Texas Eastern Gas Transmission Corporation, Dresser Industries and the Southern Pacific Railroad.

== Honors ==
Though given posthumously, DeGolyer was the first recipient, in 1966, of the DeGolyer Distinguished Service Medal awarded by the Society of Petroleum Engineers (SPE), which recognizes "distinguished service to SPE, the profession of engineering and geology, and the petroleum industry." In 1941, he received the Lucas Medal of the American Institute of Mining Engineers (AIME), and in 1942 the John Fritz Medal of the four Founder Engineering Societies. After having acted as a founder, he later received the Sidney Powers Memorial Award from the American Association of Petroleum Geologists in 1950. He felt particularly fulfilled by his 1951 election to the National Academy of Sciences and his subsequent installation at Yale University.

Everette L. DeGolyer Elementary School in Dallas, located at 3453 Flair Drive, is named after DeGolyer.

== Later life and philanthropic activities ==
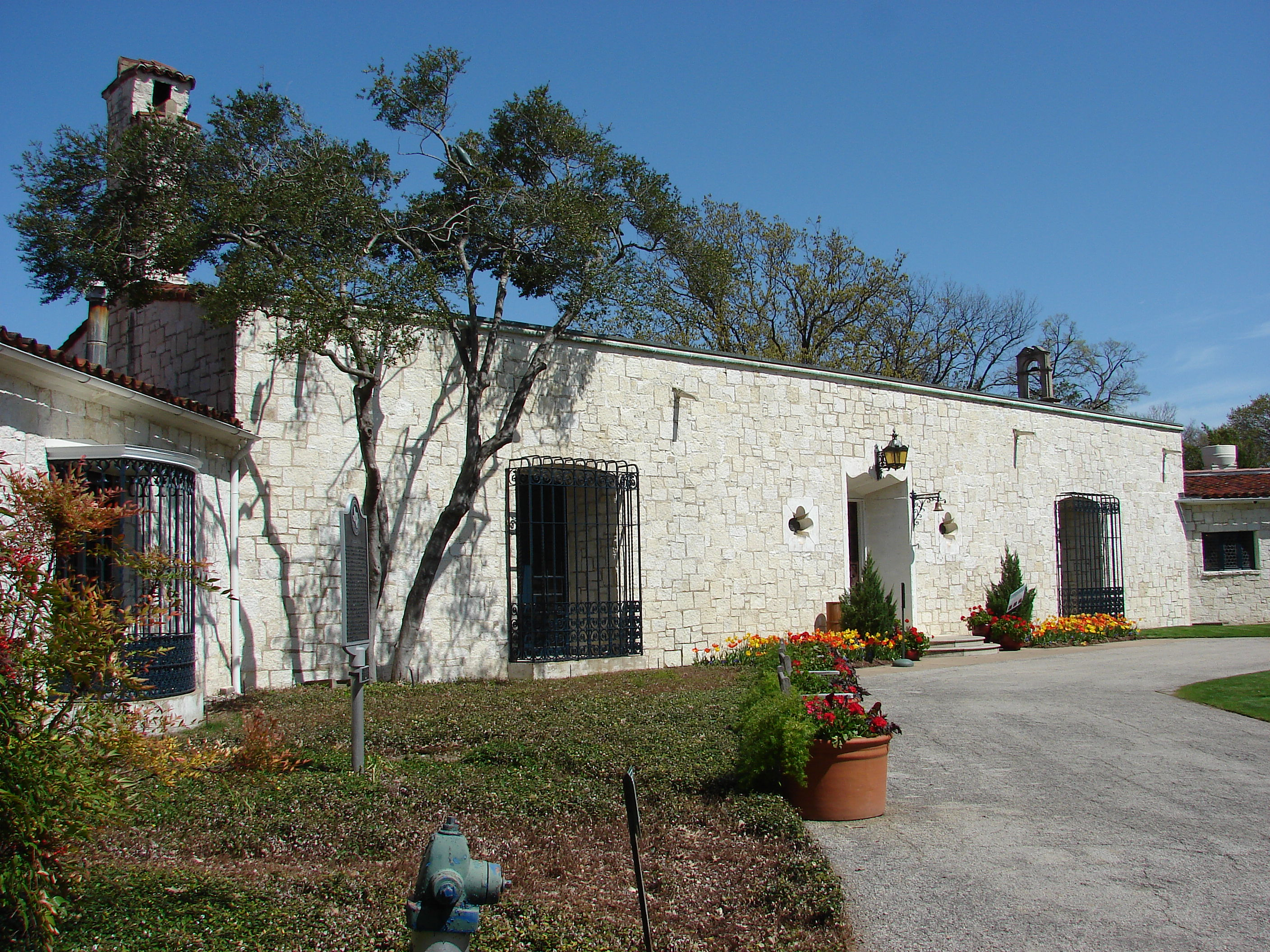
DeGolyer Estate house at the Dallas Arboretum and Botanical Garden

The DeGolyer Library at Southern Methodist University was established in 1957 by gifts from DeGolyer and his wife, Nell, and from a bequest in his will. DeGolyer served on the boards of the Dallas Museum of Art, the Dallas Arboretum, and the Dallas Public Library. The DeGolyers lived at Rancho Encinal, a Spanish Colonial Revival home in Dallas, elegantly furnished with an extensive library and museum-quality furniture and art. The 1940 estate, located on the shores of White Rock Lake, across the lake from H. L. Hunt's Mt Vernon Estate, would later become the permanent location of the Dallas Arboretum and Botanical Gardens. The DeGolyer Estate is listed on the National Register of Historic Places.

Everette and Nell DeGolyer had four children: Nell Virginia, born in Norman, Oklahoma, Dorothy Margaret, Cecilia Jeanne, and Everett Lee Jr, all born in Montclair, New Jersey. Cecilia married George C. McGhee, a protégé of Everette's, who would serve as a U.S. Undersecretary of State and U.S. Ambassador to West Germany and Turkey. DeGolyer was a prolific collector of rare books, donating his collection on the history of science to the University of Oklahoma and his collection of rare books of modern American and English writers to the University of Texas at Austin. The literary collections he donated included early editions of books by English authors Charles Dickens, Rudyard Kipling, Robert Louis Stevenson, George Bernard Shaw, Lewis Carroll, and American writers Walt Whitman, Henry David Thoreau, Herman Melville, Ernest Hemingway, Sherwood Anderson, Booth Tarkington, and Christopher Morley.

In later life, he helped to create a course on the History of Science at the University of Oklahoma. The more notable scientific books in his collection included work by Copernicus, Study of the Universe by Hbranus Maurus printed in 1467, an edition of Euclid's Elements published in 1482, a work by German physicist and astronomer Johannes Kepler, five first editions of Galileo's works, and copies of Newton's seminal work Principia Mathematica, three volumes with first edition c. 1687. The DeGolyer Library at Southern Methodist University includes law books relating to oil and gas and DeGolyer's collection on the history of Mexico and the American West. DeGolyer was involved in the founding of St. Mark's School of Texas in the early 1950s, and was on the board and served as President of the Dallas Public Library.

In September 1949 DeGolyer was diagnosed with a detached retina in his right eye, though he had been having some difficulty with vision in both eyes and had noticed the problem for at least a year. Surgery to reattach the retina was unsuccessful, though his retinal problems could have been aggravated by anemic retinopathy, not uncommon in untreated sufferers of aplastic anemia with consistently low hemoglobin counts. After being prescribed Chloromycetin, an antibiotic given to him to combat a case of the flu, he was later diagnosed with aplastic anemia, a not uncommon side effect of the drug Chloromycetin. After suffering from diminishing vision, memory problems, and a diagnosed case of aplastic anemia for around five years, Degolyer took his own life in December 1956.

== See also ==
- List of geophysicists
- DeGolyer and MacNaughton
- Geophysical Service, Inc.
- Hess Corporation, formerly Amerada Petroleum Corporation (1919) and Hess Oil and Chemical
