= Goals for Dallas =

Civic goal-setting program in Dallas, Texas

Goals for Dallas was a citizen goal-setting program in Dallas, Texas, proposed in 1964 by Mayor J. Erik Jonsson in the aftermath of the 1963 assassination of President John F. Kennedy in the city.

== History ==
The program grew out of Jonsson's inaugural address as mayor in February 1964, though the goals themselves were not drafted until 1966. It was formally instituted in December 1965. Jonsson organized the program with the participation of Dallas philanthropists and business leaders. It was a private initiative rather than a city one, although it was endorsed by the Dallas City Council, and it was reportedly modeled on the corporate planning system of Texas Instruments, the company Jonsson had co-founded. Jonsson chaired the program's board from 1965 to 1976 and was its chairman emeritus from 1976 to 1992.

Thirteen essayists, among them the journalist Holland McCombs, prepared papers on the condition of the city. Eighty-seven citizens studied the essays and then met for a three-day conference at Salado, Texas, on June 16–19, 1966, chaired by Jonsson, to draft the goals.

Conferees included district judge Sarah T. Hughes; county judge Lew Sterrett; banker and former city manager James W. Aston; Stanley Marcus of Neiman Marcus; developer John M. Stemmons; industrialist H. Neil Mallon; William P. Clements Jr., later governor of Texas; the mayors of Fort Worth, Arlington (Tom Vandergriff), Grand Prairie, Midland, and San Antonio; SMU president Willis M. Tate and historian Herbert Gambrell; Donald Cowan and Louise Cowan of the University of Dallas; physicists J. Ross Macdonald and Francis S. Johnson of the Southwest Center for Advanced Studies; physicians Charles A. LeMaistre and Emmett J. Conrad; library director Lillian M. Bradshaw; Rabbi Levi Olan; the ministers Zan Wesley Holmes Jr., H. Rhett James, and S. M. Wright; civil rights leader A. Maceo Smith; and the architect I. M. Pei, who was then designing the new Dallas City Hall. Texas Instruments president Patrick E. Haggerty and Bishop Thomas Kiely Gorman served on the planning committee but did not attend the conferences.

The goals were published in a first edition in July 1966, reviewed at neighborhood meetings in November 1966 attended by thousands of area residents, and revised at a second conference on February 10–11, 1967. The revised second edition, published in May 1967, set out 114 goals in twelve subject areas: the government of the city, the design of the city, health, welfare, transportation and communications, public safety, elementary and secondary education, higher education, continuing education, cultural activities, recreation and entertainment, and the economy of Dallas. In his preface Jonsson set the fall of 1967 as the start of a planning phase to cost and schedule the goals and identify the agencies responsible for them. A later cycle in 1976–1977 produced 205 goals; the shift from planning to implementation was marked by the 1979 publication Achieving the Goals for Dallas.

== Outcomes ==
Projects associated with the program include the expansion of the Dallas Public Library system, the creation of the Dallas County Community College District, a new Dallas City Hall, and the development of the University of Texas Southwestern Medical Center and the University of Texas at Dallas. Not all of its goals were achieved, and the program was criticized for neglecting some parts of the city.

Reviewing the 1967 goals on the program's fiftieth anniversary, Eric Nicholson of the Dallas Observer found that most were vaguely worded and few were measurable. He judged that some, such as a citywide public kindergarten and new museums of art, natural history, and science, had largely been achieved, while others, such as a mixed-use downtown, remained in progress, and a few, such as a boulevard connection between Fair Park and the central business district, had not come to pass. Nicholson noted that the goals did not address race, which he called a major omission, but that they otherwise advocated public transportation, sex education, job training for convicts, and walkability.
