= Edward Gordon Perry Jr =

Edward Gordon Perry
- Born: Edward Gordon Perry Jr. September 29, 1912; El Paso, Texas
- Died: March 14, 2013 (aged 100)
- Education: Southern Methodist University
- Engineering career
- Discipline: Electrical, Computer
- Employer(s): Texas Instruments (formerly known as GSI), Recognition Equipment Inc.(REI)

Edward "Gordon" Perry Jr. (September 29, 1912 – March 14, 2013) was an American inventor and businessman who served as chief research engineer for Texas Instruments. He was also a co-founder of Recognition Equipment, Inc, (REI). He is best known for inventing the first commercially viable Retina Character Reader (today known as the optical scanner or OCR).

== Early life and education ==
Perry was born in El Paso and subsequently moved to Dallas at age nine. As a teenager, Perry was given free rein in the mechanics garage of his father's car dealership and began to build race cars. He graduated from the Southern Methodist University in 1933, with an engineering degree.

His first business was Custom Built Camera Accessories Co. where, in addition to altering and designing movie cameras for special effects and animation for TV stations, he altered individual's cameras to increase their functionality. After completing this customization, Perry would return the camera to the customer with the new features at the agreed price or in its original condition for no charge, if he was unable to make the alteration. This enabled him to get paid while inventing new camera ideas and registering patents on these inventions. This camera optics experience and his engineering background would contribute to his future invention of the Optical Retina Reader

== Career ==
=== Texas Instruments (TI) 1944 - 1961 ===
After the US entered World War II, Perry joined Geophysical Service Inc.(GSI) to help create a magnetic airborne submarine detector. The underwater radar he designed to detect German and Japanese submarines from airplanes was successful and helped contribute to find enemy's subs, even as close to the US as the Gulf of Mexico. When G.S.I. became Texas Instruments in 1951, Perry continued to work there as a Research Engineer and inventor accumulating 75 patents in his name. His work on the Silicon Crystal Puller helped enable T.I. to have Silicon Transistors at least 10 years ahead of the industry. In recognition for his work, he was given the second Silicon Crystal ever produced. While at TI, Perry also worked on the team at TI's Central Research Laboratories (CRL) where Jack Kilby, in 1958, invented the integrated circuit.

=== Recognition Equipment Inc.(REI) 1961 – 1967. Invention of Retina Character Reader ===
After leaving TI in 1961 and founding National Data Processing Engineering (NDP), Perry designed and built a scanner computer for Southwest Medical School to reduce the analysis time of 3D x-ray movies of the heart to minutes instead of days. NDP also got a contract with the Federal Reserve System to automate check sorting. Remington Rand later bought NDP to access the sorter. Perry then co-founded Recognition Equipment Inc. (REI) where he developed his version of an optical scanner. He worked on a commercially viable Optical Reader, which could identify and “read” typed and handwritten text and numbers. The early designs of this invention were developed in his home garage and REI provided the means to bring his vision “to life”, as he taught computers to read. One of his page readers is in the Smithsonian Institution. The first multi-font reader was introduced in 1964 and sold to United Airlines. Perry's optical data reader from REI could read 2000 typewritten characters per second, replacing a company's entire keypunch department. REI's stock went public in 1965 and was successful enough to enable Perry to retire in 1967.

== Other significant achievements ==
- Remote Control Lawnmower

In the late 1950s, Perry customized and patented an electric lawnmower, which was manufactured and marketed by Sears and Roebuck, and converted it into one of the first remote controlled lawnmower. With a simple design of just two switches consisting of an on-off toggle and a right-left dial, the user was able to operate it from inside their air-conditioned home. An attempt by Sears to market the lawnmower in 1963 failed because the consumers, brought to a focus group, didn't believe that Sears would be able to train anyone to repair this “space age” lawn mower except the man who created it (Perry) and there would never be enough time for him to repair all the lawnmowers that were sold.

- Aerial Camera

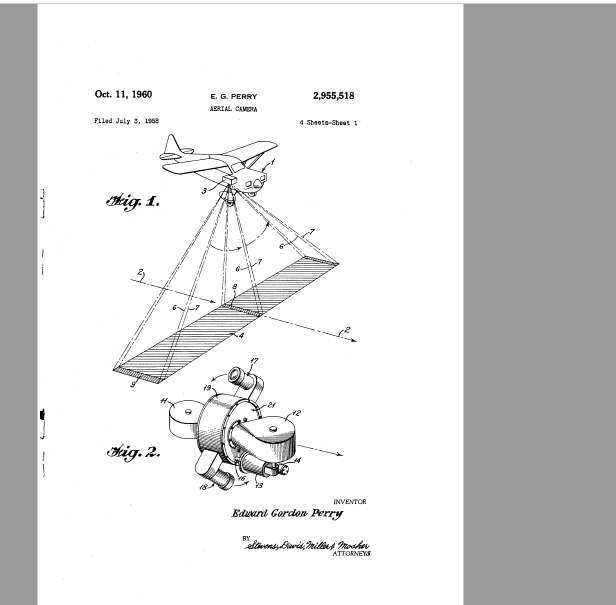
Aerial Camera

- Docuteller.

Spun off a new company, Docutel, to bring the first Automatic Teller Machine (ATM), named the Docuteller, to market. Perry was instrumental in helping Donald Wetzel with the concept and design.

- In 1965, REI introduced a 45-foot (14m) long electronic “crawl” display designed by Perry, which was installed on the trading floor of the New York Stock Exchange (NYSE).
