= Erik Jonsson =

Erik Jonsson may refer to:

- J. Erik Jonsson (1901–1995), American businessman and mayor of Dallas, Texas
- Erik Jonsson (sport shooter) (1873–1958), Swedish sports shooter
