= Eugene McDermott =

American geophysicist and businessman

- Born: February 12, 1899; New York City, US
- Died: August 23, 1973 (aged 74); Dallas, Texas, US
- Education: Stevens Institute of Technology; Columbia University (MA)
- Occupations: Petroleum geophysicist, Engineer, Electronics corporate executive
- Known for: Co-founder of Texas Instruments
- Spouse: Margaret Milam (m. 1952)
- Children: 1

Eugene B. McDermott (February 12, 1899 – August 23, 1973) was an American engineer and geophysicist who co-founded Geophysical Service Incorporated (GSI) in 1930 and later its parent company Texas Instruments in 1951. One of his most widely acclaimed early patented inventions enabled oil exploration equipment that used reflection seismographs to map underground rock strata using sound wave technology, a method still widely used today in oil exploration. Other inventions ranged from geochemical applications to antisubmarine warfare, often focusing on the use of sonar.

== Early life and career ==
Born in Brooklyn, New York, McDermott graduated from Stevens Institute of Technology in 1919 with a mechanical engineering degree. Upon graduation, he began working for the Goodyear Rubber Company. In 1923, McDermott found work with Western Electric Company where he first met J. Clarence Karcher. Earlier, Everette Lee DeGolyer, vice president and general manager of Amerada Petroleum Corporation, had learned of Karcher's 1921 experiments with the seismograph and held a meeting with Karcher that resulted in the creation of Geophysical Research Corporation (GRC) of Tulsa, where Karcher was made vice president. GRC was created as a subsidiary of Amerada Oil, of which DeGolyer was a board member and rose to the office of President.

McDermott received a Master of Arts in physics from Columbia University in 1925 and immediately began to work for his friend Karcher who hired him to work for Geophysical Research Corporation. GRC introduced the seismographic reflection method to locate oil deposits which was quickly accepted by the petroleum industry as a promising new tool. The method attempted to locate the domes and anticlines that held oil deposits, by using a controlled explosion on the surface to beam sound waves into the earth. Strategically placed sensors then recorded the speed and frequency at which the waves were reflected back to the surface by subterranean layers of rock, with the goal of creating a record of the depth, density, and physical properties of each layer.

== Geophysical Service Incorporated ==
In 1930, with the backing of Amerada President Everette Lee DeGolyer who invested $100 thousand for a 50% share, Karcher and McDermott launched Geophysical Service Incorporated, a pioneering provider of seismic exploration services to the petroleum industry with Karcher as president and McDermott as vice-president. McDermott's early work in petroleum exploration led to multiple papers and five patents. During the first year of operation, McDermott hired Cecil H. Green. These two would have a lasting relationship for the next 43 years.

In 1939, the company reorganized as Coronado Corp., an oil company with Geophysical Service Inc (GSI), now as a subsidiary. On December 6, 1941, McDermott along with three other GSI employees, J. Erik Jonsson, Cecil H. Green, and H.B. Peacock purchased GSI. During World War II, GSI built electronics for the United States Army Signal Corps and the Navy. After the war, GSI continued to produce electronics. The rugged nature of oil equipment proved particularly suitable for use in the military which required durability in their instruments, so the military become a ready market for the company's products. In November 1945, Patrick E. Haggerty joined GSI.

== Texas Instruments ==
In 1951, McDermott, along with Cecil Howard Green, Patrick E. Haggerty, and J. Erik Jonsson co-founded Texas Instruments, with GSI becoming a wholly owned subsidiary of the new company. This acknowledged that GSI as a subsidiary would focus primarily on oil exploration and the larger parent company Texas Instruments would be focused on manufacturing. McDermott was the Chairman of TI from 1951 to 1957, Chairman of the executive committee of Board of Directors from 1957 to 1964 and Director until his death in 1973. During this period, Texas Instruments rose to be one of the world's largest corporations.

== Professional societies ==
McDermott had membership in the American Association of Petroleum Geologists, the Society of Exploration Geophysicists for which he was president from 1933 to 1934, the Seismological Society of America, the American Physicians Society, the Institute of Electrical and Electronics Engineers, the American Mathematical Society, the American Geographical Society, and the American Association for the Advancement of Science.

== Philanthropy ==
A scientist and businessman, McDermott was particularly interested in improving education, which he called "biological humanics." Along with Cecil Green, he was a co-founder of St. Mark's School of Texas in 1950; their endowment included the donation of a planetarium, observatory, and math-science quadrangle. He was a major donor to many universities and was on the boards of Southern Methodist University, Massachusetts Institute of Technology (MIT), and Southwestern Medical School in Dallas. He co-founded the Graduate Research Center of the Southwest in 1961, which became the University of Texas at Dallas (UTD) in 1969. In 2001, his wife Margaret endowed the Eugene McDermott Scholars Program at UTD.

The couple gifted Fredericksburg, Texas with a home for the county's Pioneer Memorial Library by restoring the 1882 Gillespie County Courthouse.

McDermott was actively involved in the arts, on the Boards of the Dallas Public Library, the Dallas Museum of Art, and the Dallas Symphony Orchestra, and aided in the conception of the Margo Jones Theatre, an early experiment in theatre in the round.

The annual Eugene McDermott Award in the Arts was created at MIT in 1974, and carries a $100,000 stipend as of 2014. The Award celebrates individuals whose artistic trajectory reveals that they will achieve the highest distinction in their fields and continue to produce inspiring work for many years to come. The stipend represents an investment in the recipient's future creative work, rather than a prize for a particular project or lifetime of achievement. The awardee becomes an artist in residence at MIT, studying and teaching for a period of time.

He died at his home in Dallas on August 23, 1973, after an illness of several months. He was buried at Hillcrest Memorial Park in Dallas after services were held at Dallas's Highland Park Methodist Church.
