= J. Clarence Karcher =

American geophysicist and businessman

John Clarence Karcher
- Born: April 15, 1894; Dale, Indiana
- Died: July 13, 1978 (aged 84); Dallas, Texas
- Education: 1916, BSEE; University of Oklahoma; 1920, PHd Physics; University of Pennsylvania
- Known for: Invention of the reflection seismograph
- Spouse: Lydia Kilborn
- Awards: Anthony Lucas Medal, from the American Institute of Mining, Metallurgical and Petroleum Engineers

John Clarence Karcher (April 15, 1894 – July 13, 1978) was an American geophysicist and businessman. He invented and eventually commercialized the reflection seismograph, applying for patents in 1919. By the patenting, and development of reflection seismography, he created the means by which most of the world's oil reserves have been discovered. In 1930 he, Eugene McDermott, and Everette Lee DeGolyer founded Geophysical Service Incorporated, a pioneering provider of seismic exploration services to the petroleum industry that focused on reflection seismology.

== Biography ==
=== Early life ===
John Clarence Karcher was born on April 15, 1894, in Dale, Indiana. He was the son of Leo and Mary (Madlon) Karcher. When he was five the family moved to Oklahoma Territory and settled in a farming community near Hennessey. In 1912 he earned a high school diploma.

=== Education ===
As an undergraduate, Karcher attended the University of Oklahoma where in 1916 he received a BS degree in both Electrical Engineering and physics and was at the head of his class. When the university was granted a chapter in 1918, he was elected to Phi Beta Kappa.

Upon graduation Karcher accepted the Tyndal Fellowship in Physics at the University of Pennsylvania where he began graduate work in September 1916. For his PhD thesis he focused on X-ray emissions, but continued research into geophysics. While he completed his doctorate, he was associated with the Geological Engineering Company, organized by his former professors Ohern and Haseman. The company was the first to commercialize the concept of the reflection seismograph.

World War I interrupted his graduate studies and he served with the United States Bureau of Standards. His assignment was to locate heavy artillery batteries in France by studying the acoustic waves the guns generated in the air. He noted an unexpected event in his research and switched his concentration to seismic waves in the earth. He thought it would be possible to determine the depth of underlying geological strata by vibrating the Earth's surface while precisely recording and timing the returning waves of energy (sound waves). On October 16, 1920, Karcher married Lydia Kilborn; they had two children.

=== Career ===
In 1919, Karcher applied for patents in reflection seismography. By 1921, he had validated reflection seismology as an authentic tool in the search for oil but at the time oil prices were too low for oil companies to budget for this new technology. Unable at the time to pursue a career in petroleum exploration, Karcher went to work for the Bureau of Standards, and then joined Western Electric Company where he performed research on ocean-bottom telegraph cable. It was here that he first met a young Eugene McDermott.

==== Amerada and GRC ====
E. L. DeGolyer, 1913

Later when Everette Lee DeGolyer, vice president and general manager of Amerada Petroleum Corporation, learned of Karcher's 1921 experiments with the seismograph he held a meeting with Karcher that resulted in the creation of Geophysical Research Corporation (GRC) by 1925.

GRC would function as a subsidiary of Amerada Petroleum which had been formally established in 1920. Karcher was made vice president, with a $300,000 research fund and a considerable 15 percent stock interest, which he had negotiated with DeGolyer. One of his first actions after establishing headquarters in Bloomfield, New Jersey, was to hire Eugene McDermott, his protégé from Western Electric, then a Columbia University graduate student. GRC began using seismographic refraction but would introduce the seismic reflection method which over the next five years was accepted by the petroleum industry as a promising new tool. Relatively shallow salt domes could be located successfully with the refraction technique, and this constituted most of GRC's activity in its early years. Rather than simply locating salt domes, reflection seismography could find the location, or at least provide significant clues about where actual pools of oil were located. Major wells drilled next to salt domes included Spindletop in South Texas, and a well in Nash, Texas. In December 1928, Amerada's drill penetrated the Viola limestone in the Seminole, Oklahoma, area and produced the first oil well in history to be drilled in a structure found by a reflection seismograph.

==== Geophysical Service Inc. ====
In 1930, with the backing of DeGolyer, now president of Amerada, Karcher and McDermott, with a 50% interest purchased by DeGolyer for $100,000, launched the petroleum exploration company Geophysical Service Incorporated. Karcher served as president and McDermott as vice-president of the newly formed oil exploration company.

Karcher and his staff took the remaining 50% interest. In 1941, DeGolyer and Karcher sold their controlling interest in GSI to GSI Vice-president Eugene McDermott, and employees Cecil Green, Erik Jonsson and H. P. Peacock. Remaining as a wholly owned subsidiary pursuing oil exploration services, GSI spun off Texas Instruments(TI) in 1951. TI would find enormous success and growth pursuing a broader range of electronics manufacturing. Karcher would continue in leadership roles with oil production and exploration companies, but would be largely divested of his interest in GSI by 1950, prior to the inception of TI.

==== Other oil executive roles ====
Karcher served as president and general manager of Coronado Corporation, a subsidiary of Texas Instruments, from 1939 to 1941, and as chairman of the board of Las Tecas Petroleum Company from 1941 to 1945. He served as president and chairman of the board of Comanche Corporation from 1945 to 1950. He was president of Concho Petroleum Company from 1950 until the time of his death in 1974.

==== Professional affiliations ====
Karcher served as the president of the Society of Exploration Geophysicists, was a fellow in the American Association for the Advancement of Science, and a member of the American Physical Society. He also served as charter member of the Dallas Petroleum Club.

== Legacy ==
On June 4, 1971, the Geophysical Society of Oklahoma city erected a monument in the front lawn of Belle Isle Library, recording how in 1921 Karcher and his team recorded their first seismic data, and "proved the validity of the reflection seismograph as a useful tool in the search for oil."

To honor Karcher's contribution to the use of geophysical methods in oil exploration, the J. Clarence Karcher Award is given in recognition of significant contributions to the science and technology of exploration geophysics. In 1976, Karcher received the Anthony Lucas Medal from the American Institute of Mining and Metallurgical and Petroleum Engineers for his invention and development of the reflection seismograph. He was a member of the Geological Society, the Society of Exploration Geophysicists, and a charter member of the petroleum club.

Karcher died of an apparent heart attack in a Dallas hospital on July 13, 1978. His funeral was on July 10 at Highland Park Presbyterian in Dallas, and he was buried in his birthplace of Hennessey, Oklahoma.
