= Jonsson Engineering Center =

Engineering building at Rensselaer Polytechnic

Coordinates: 42°43′47″N 73°40′49″W

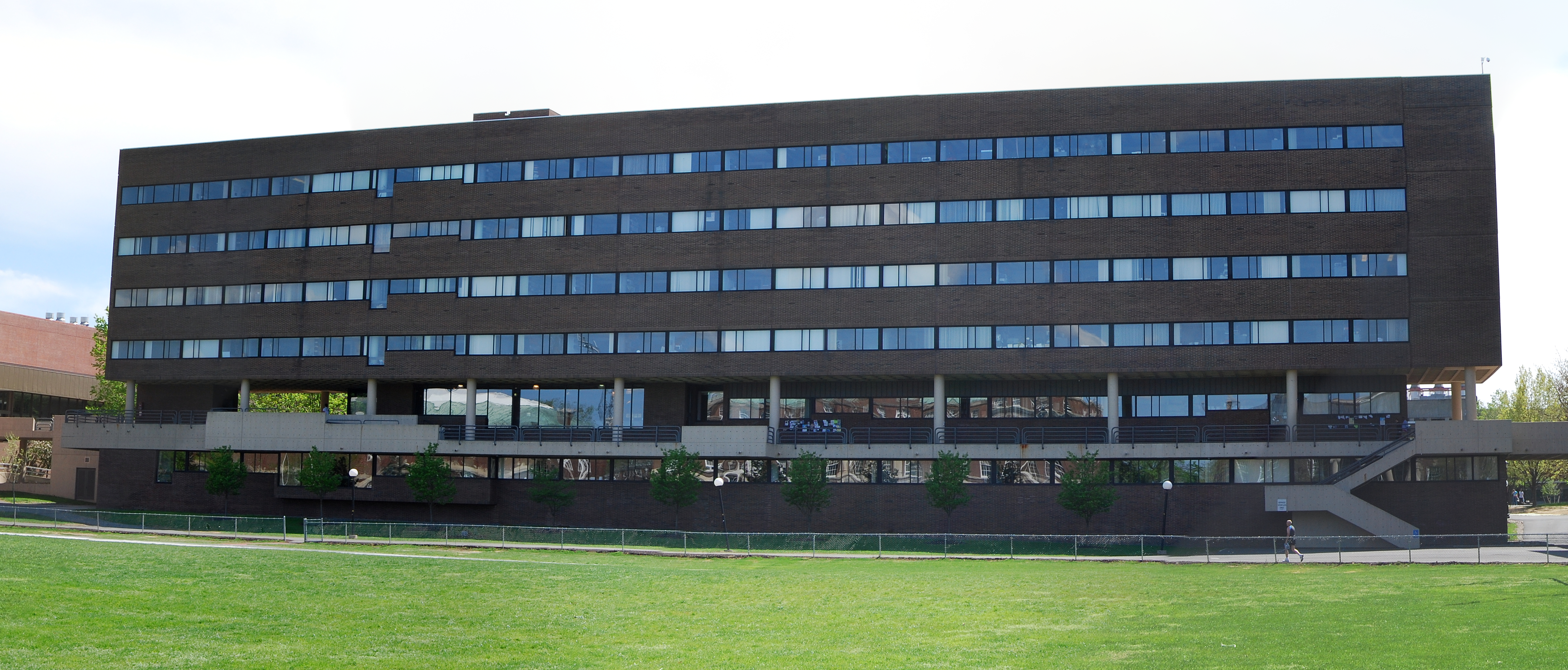
- The Jonsson Engineering Center
- Interactive map of the Jonsson Engineering Center area
- Alternative names: JEC
- Etymology: Named for J. Erik Jonsson

General information
- Location: Troy, New York, United States
- Construction started: April 18, 1975
- Completed: Fall 1977
- Opened: October 7, 1977
- Cost: $17,800,000

Technical details
- Floor count: 7
- Lifts/elevators: 2

The Jonsson Engineering Center (often simply referred to as the JEC), is home to the School of Engineering at Rensselaer Polytechnic Institute in Troy, New York. It is named for J. Erik Jonsson and was dedicated on 7 October 1977.

== Background on J. Erik Jonsson ==
J. Erik Jonsson graduated from Rensselaer in 1922. He was a co-founder of Texas Instruments, co-founder of The University of Texas at Dallas, former mayor of Dallas, TX, and one of Rensselaer's most generous benefactors. The Jonsson-Rowland Science Center, for which he provided funding, opened on the Rensselaer campus in 1961. It shares his name with that of Henry A. Rowland, Class of 1870, physicist and first president of the American Physical Society. Jonsson provided $2,600,000 toward the construction of the Jonsson Engineering Center.

== Planning ==
In February 1974 plans for a new engineering center were made public. An analysis of the Russell Sage Laboratory, Troy Building and Ricketts Building was made by the firm of Levatich, Miller & Hoffman (Peter S. Levatich, Class of 1955). They recommended two options:

- demolish the Troy Building and construct a new building in its place
- demolish the Troy Building and link the Russell Sage Laboratory and the Ricketts Building together

In the spring of 1974, the first option was approved and the Troy Building was scheduled for demolition during the summer. In June 1974, the Board of Trustees considered the situation and decided to build a brand new building between the Greene Building and the Communication Center, which is now known as the Darrin Communications Center. In the Fall of 1974, a model of the new seven story engineering center was presented.

On 4 March 1975, the initial cost estimate for the building was $11,808,100. Jonsson provided $2,600,000 and the New York State Dormitory Fund provided some funds. A thirty year bond was taken to cover most of the cost, which resulted in annual payments by Rensselaer of $202,000. The final cost of the building was $17,800,000.

== Construction ==
A unique ground breaking ceremony took place on April 18, 1975. An underground explosion on the nearby '86 field was triggered by a long distance phone call placed by Margaret Jonsson, J. Erik Jonsson's wife, from Dallas, Texas.

Construction for the building progressed smoothly and was completed on schedule in the fall of 1977. During construction, the '86 Field was referred to as the '43 Field since one-half of it was used as a staging area. Formal dedication of the Jonsson Engineering Center took place on October 7, 1977.

== Facilities ==
Each floor of the building is dedicated to a different discipline of engineering and contains many major research facilities and a large number of academic classrooms. The ground floor contains classrooms, administrative offices and a lounge. The basement contains several laboratories, including the mechatronics lab and the geotechnical centrifuge research center. The O.T. Swanson Multidisciplinary Design Laboratory in the former high bay area of the JEC provides undergraduate students from multiple engineering disciplines, management, humanities, architecture, and science with a facility and the resources to work together on challenging, real-world problems. . One of RPI's sub-sonic wind tunnels is also located in the JEC.
