= May Dickson Exall =

American civic leader

May Dickson Exall (August 14, 1859 – September 28, 1936) was an American civic leader and co-founder of the Dallas Public Library and the Dallas Museum of Fine Arts (now the Dallas Museum of Art).
