= Cleora Clanton =

American librarian (1891–1968)

- Born: October 27, 1891; Dallas, Texas
- Died: September 16, 1968 (aged 76); Dallas
- Occupation: librarian
- Parent(s): Robert Allen Clanton and Susanna Elizabeth Webb

Cleora Clanton (October 27, 1891 – September 16, 1968) was an American librarian. She helped open a branch library for the community in Dallas, Texas.

== Early life ==
Clanton was born on October 27, 1891 to parents Robert Allen Clanton and Susanna Elizabeth Webb in Dallas, Texas.

== Career ==
In 1915, Clanton began her library career when she accepted a position with the Dallas Public Library. Over the years, she was appointed to branch librarian, assistant librarian, and eventually acting librarian before becoming head of the Dallas Public Library in 1927. After her promotion, she had to face the libraries financial crisis due to a lack of funding. In 1924, she revealed that there was an increase of over 5, 000 book loans from the Dallas Public Library, despite the increased popularity of radio. Although there was an increase, Clanton reported the library needed $25,000 worth of repairs. While she was head of the Dallas Public Library, Clanton was also elected President of the Texas Library Association.

In 1929, Dallas had two libraries, Central and Oak Cliff. Clanton was one of the major advocates for branch libraries. She also created bookmobiles as a resource to reach more of the Dallas population. This was in part due to the drop in library book loans due to WW2. She also actively supported the creation of a library branch to serve Dallas' African-American community. In 1941, Clanton was selected for the Library Publicity Honor Roll.

“Probably no institution in the city touches the lives of the citizens at more points than the public library”

— Clanton on the importance of libraries.

In the 1950s, she fought against the United States censorship of reading materials. She spoke in front of the City Council of Dallas to advocate for the allowance of pamphlet funding of material that the Council deemed "un-American." When ordered to remove Communist material from the library, she refused on the basis that knowledge of Communism was not in itself harmful. In 1955, she retired and was succeeded by James Meeks. Although she was replaced, she kept her role as associate librarian with a salary of $500 a month. Before retiring, she helped lead the campaign for construction of a new library building in downtown Dallas.
