= MS Arctic Explorer =

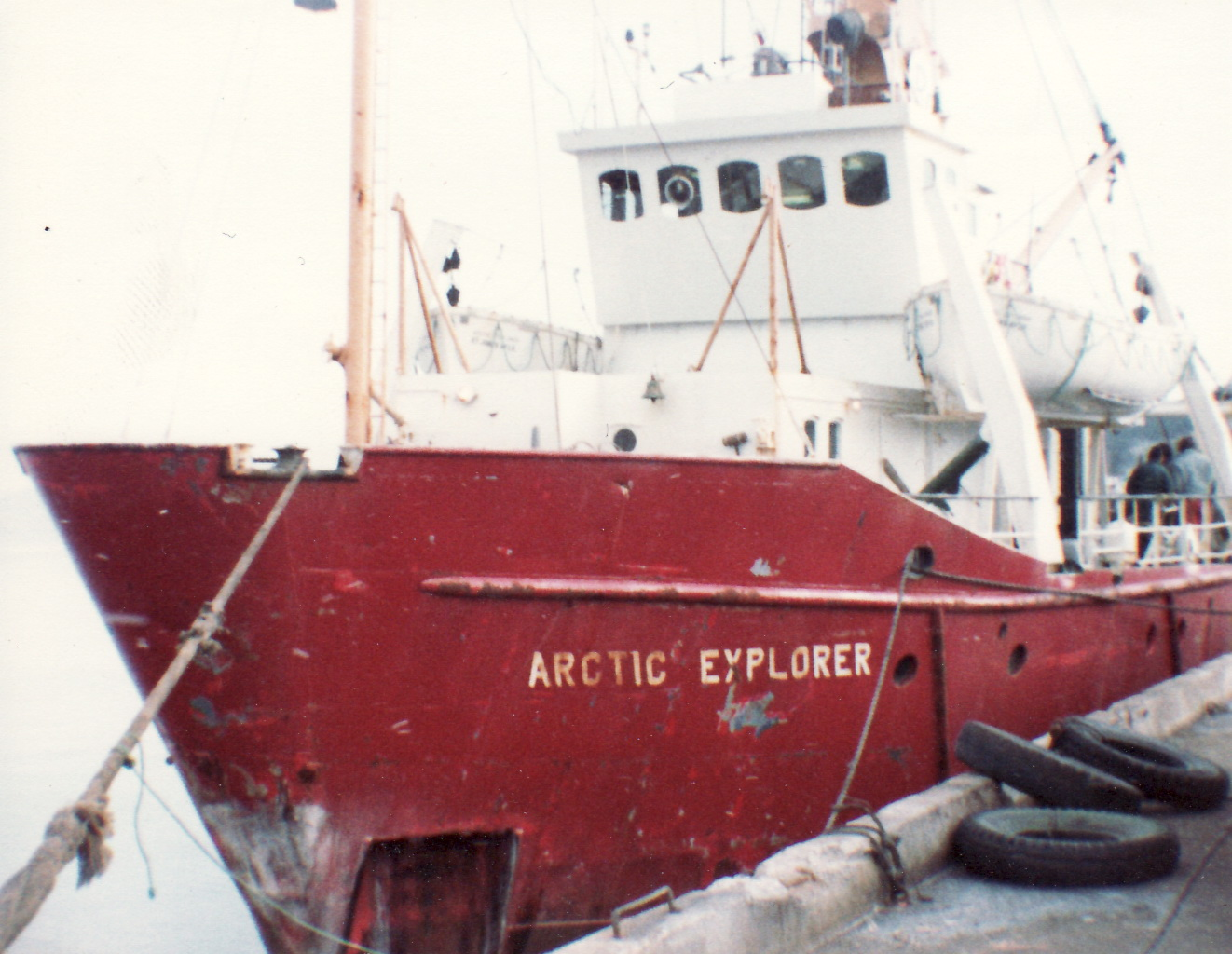
- MS Arctic Explorer in port

History

Canada
- Name: Arctic Explorer
- Builder: Hoivolds
- Yard number: 48
- Laid down: 1973
- Launched: 1973
- Completed: 1974
- Out of service: July 1981
- Identification: IMO number: 7369065
- Fate: Sank on 3 July 1981

General characteristics
- Class & type: Icebreaker
- Tonnage: 991 GT
- Length: 49.5 metres (162 ft)
- Beam: 11.5 metres (38 ft)
- Speed: 12.5 kn (23 km/h; 14 mph)

MS Arctic Explorer was a ship which sank off St. Anthony, Newfoundland, in the Strait of Belle Isle, on 3 July 1981.

Arctic Explorer was built by the Hoivolds shipyard of Kristiansand, Norway as a sealer. She was laid down in March 1973, launched in November, and delivered in January 1974. She had a gross tonnage of 991 GT and a deadweight tonnage of 331 DWT, with a length of 49.5 metres (162 ft) and a beam of 11.5 metres (38 ft). She was powered by a single diesel engine that gave her a service speed of 12.5 knots (23.2 km/h).

At the time of her loss, Arctic Explorer was owned by the Newfoundland company Carino and chartered to Geophysical Service, Inc. (GSI) for the purpose of conducting seismic surveys off the Labrador coast for British Petroleum. She departed the port of St. Anthony early on the morning of 3 July, and at about 07:40 local time began listing to starboard in the Strait of Belle Isle, according to a survivor. A few minutes after 08:00, a short distress tone was heard by Canadian Coast Guard stations in St. Anthony and Comfort Cove, and the St. Anthony station heard an auto-alarm that would typically precede a distress call, though no voice communication was ever heard from Arctic Explorer. The Coast Guard did not investigate the signals. The crew abandoned ship into two liferafts—the ship's list prevented the launch of lifeboats—and 19 of the 32 crew eventually took refuge on a single undamaged raft.

As the Coast Guard had failed to follow up on the signals it received, Arctic Explorer was not reported missing until the following day, after she had missed three scheduled radio calls with GSI, which contacted the Coast Guard in the late morning. A DHC-5 Buffalo was dispatched from Summerside, Prince Edward Island, and searched the ocean near St. Anthony all afternoon with no result. On 5 July, additional Coast Guard aircraft and ships reached the area to join the search, and shortly after midnight on 6 July a plane spotted the liferaft with survivors onboard. The icebreaker Grenfell rescued the raft and its occupants; later in the day, eight bodies were located, while the remaining five crewmembers were never found. Captain William Jack King of Badger’s Quay went down with the ship.

A Transport Canada inquiry found that the cause of the sinking was likely the starboard list, but did not find direct evidence; rather, it came to the conclusion by eliminating other possible causes, and the reason for the list to occur in the first place was not found.

there is a website with a documentary about the sinking at https://www.thearcticexplorer.com
