= Old Dallas Central Library =

Building in Dallas, Texas, U.S.

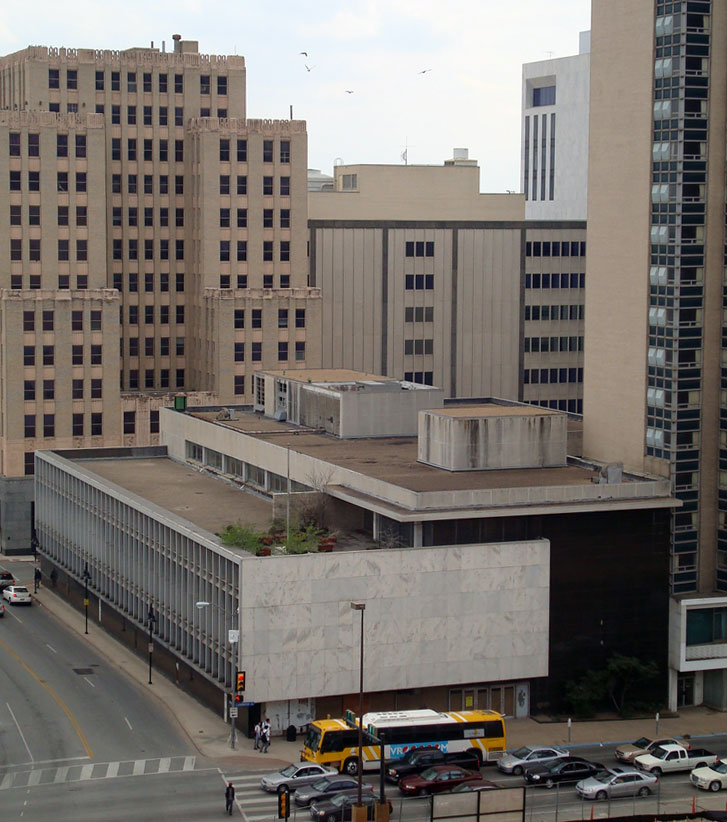
- Old Dallas Central Library in 2007
- Former names: Dallas Public Library

General information
- Architectural style: Mid-Century modern
- Location: 1954 Commerce Street, Dallas, Texas, U.S.
- Coordinates: 32°46′50″N 96°47′39″W
- Construction started: 1954
- Completed: 1955
- Cost: $2.5 million

Technical details
- Floor count: 4 above + 2 below
- Floor area: 120,000 square feet

Design and construction
- Architect: George Dahl
- Dallas Public Library
- U.S. Historic district – Contributing property
- Dallas Landmark Historic District; Contributing Property
- Part of: Dallas Downtown Historic District (ID04000894)
- DLMKHD No.: H/48 (Harwood HD)

Significant dates
- Designated CP: August 11, 2006
- Designated DLMKHD: February 28, 1990

The former Dallas Public Library, now known as Old Dallas Central Library, is a multi-level civic structure located at 1954 Commerce Street in downtown Dallas, Texas, United States. It is located on the edge of the Farmers Market District and adjacent to Main Street Garden Park. It is a contributing property in the Dallas Downtown Historic District and the Harwood Street Historic District and, along with the adjacent Dallas Statler Hilton, represents the best block of mid-twentieth-century architecture in Dallas. It was part of Dallas Public Library.

== History ==
The Dallas Public Library was designed by noted architect George Dahl as the replacement for the 1901 Carnegie Library located on the same site. While Carnegie Library was being razed and the new library constructed, the Dallas Public Library moved their collections to Union Station temporarily.

The library opened in September 1955 capable of holding 800,000 volumes but only containing 300,000 books. It contained 120,000 square feet (11,000 m^{2}) on 4 above ground levels and 2 below ground levels, with provisions for 2 additional floors in the future. The auditorium in the second basement seated 250 people and a terrace allowed for a rooftop garden.

The Dallas Public Library moved their collection to the larger J. Erik Jonsson Central Library upon completion of that building in 1982. The building was sold to an investment company which also owns the adjacent Dallas Statler Hilton, but the building has remained vacant since the library's departure.

In December 2017 The Dallas Morning News relocated its headquarters to the building after a lengthy redevelopment. The newspaper's increased focus on creating digital content and relocation of the printing presses from the former Young Street headquarters were cited as reasons for the transfer.

=== Controversial artwork ===
From the beginning, the new library building's artwork caused controversy. Harry Bertoia was commissioned to design a metal screen to hang above the circulation desk. When his $8,500 abstract "Textured Screen" was unveiled in 1955, Dallas Mayor R.L. Thornton called it “a bunch of junk painted up,” and a “cheap welding job.” Outrage over the sculpture grew so much that architect George Dahl purchased the artwork himself and moved it to his private home, where it remained until wealthy and embarrassed citizens donated money for the sculpture. It was reinstalled in time for the library's opening, and now resides inside the J. Erik Jonsson Central Library.

The façade of the library contained an 880-pound, 20-foot (6.1 m) high aluminum sculpture by Marshall Fredericks entitled "Youth in the Hands of God." Symbolizing "the hands of God supporting youth reaching for learning through the medium of literature," the $12,000 relief sculpture depicted two hands lifting a boy wearing blue jeans. The library planned to take the sculpture with them to the new building, but it remained on the empty building for several years. In 1993 the sculpture was sold and now resides at the Marshall M. Fredericks Sculpture Museum at Saginaw Valley State University.

== Gallery ==
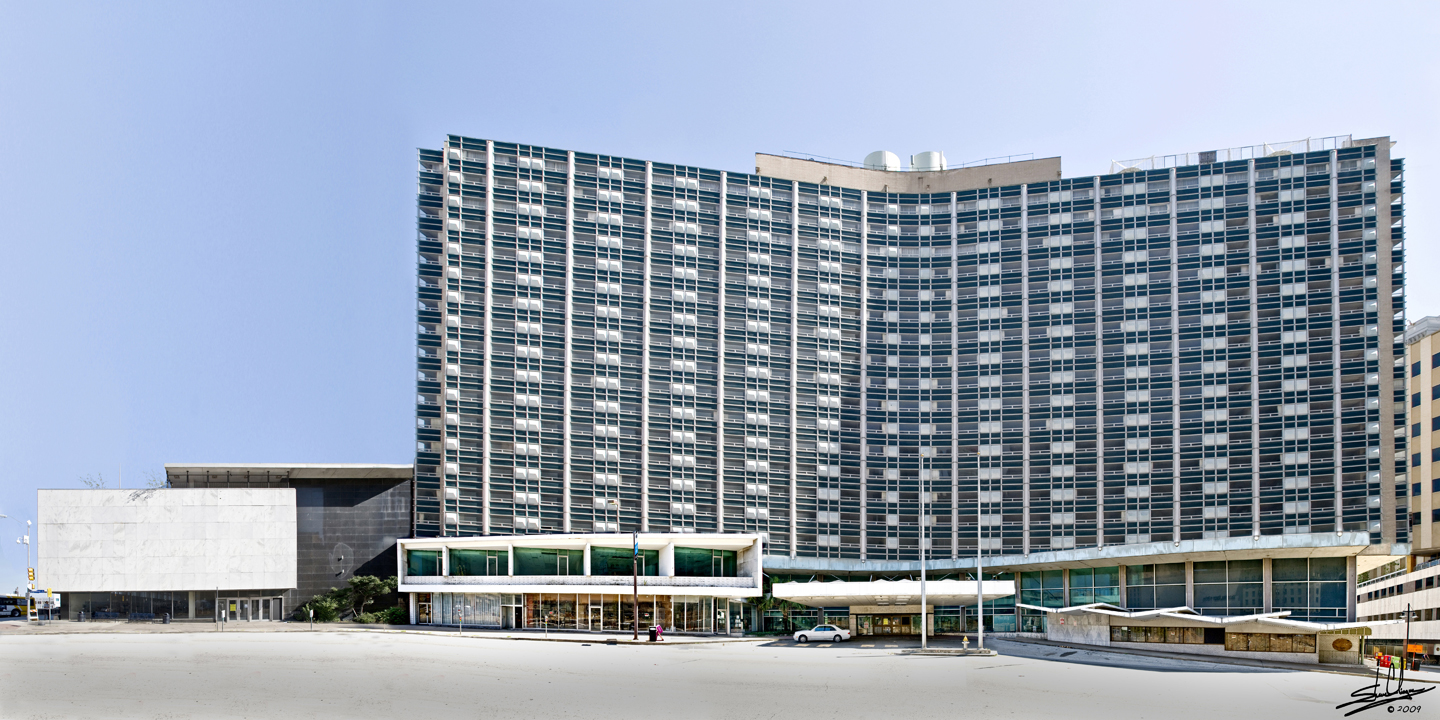
Dallas Public Library and Dallas Statler Hilton block

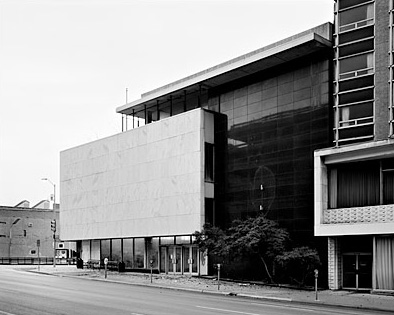
"Youth in the Hands of God" once hung on the metal hooks against the black granite façade

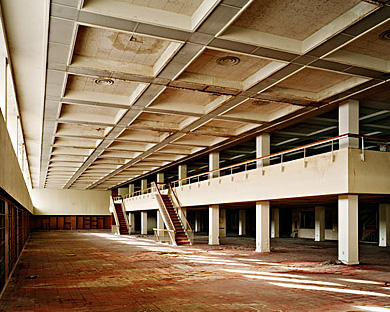
Interior ground level reading room

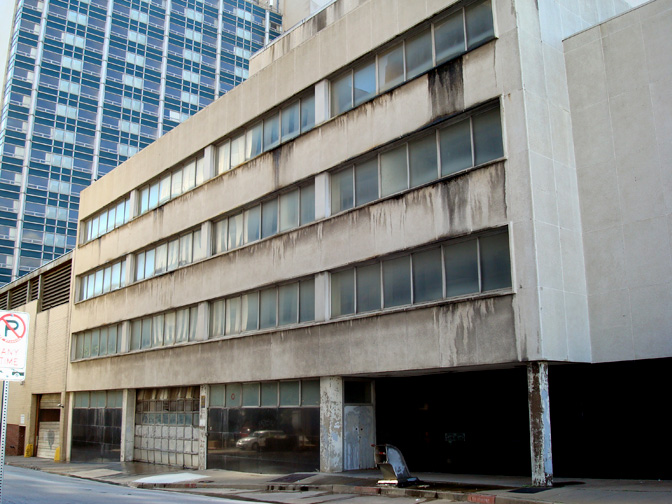
Back of building along Jackson Street

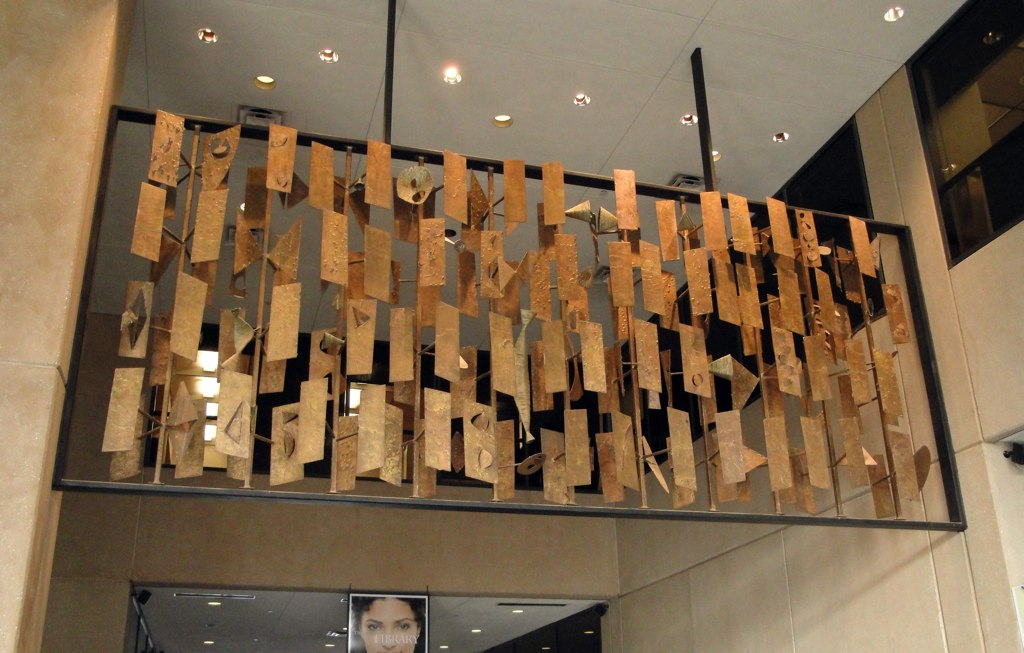
Harry Bertoia's "Textured Screen"

== See also ==
- National Register of Historic Places listings in Dallas County, Texas
- List of Dallas Landmarks
