= J. Erik Jonsson =

American businessperson and politician

49th Mayor of Dallas
- In office 1964–1971
- Preceded by: Earle Cabell
- Succeeded by: Wes Wise

Personal details
- Born: John Erik Jonsson; 6 September 1901 Brooklyn, New York City, U.S.
- Died: 31 August 1995 (aged 93) Dallas, Texas, U.S.
- Spouse: Margaret
- Children: 3
- Education: Rensselaer Polytechnic Institute (BSME)
- Known for: Co-founder of Texas Instruments

John Erik Jonsson (6 September 1901 – 31 August 1995) was an American businessman who was co-founder and early president of Texas Instruments Incorporated. He became Mayor of Dallas, a position in which he became a major advocate for civic causes, including the Dallas Fort Worth International Airport, and was a philanthropist in his later years.

== Biography ==
=== Early life ===
Erik Jonsson was born on 6 September 1901 in the Brooklyn borough of New York City. His parents, John Peter and Ellen Charlotte (Palmquist) Jonsson, were both born in Sweden and independently migrated to the United States in the prior decade. Both were naturalized citizens. Jonsson was an only child. The family moved in 1912 to Montclair, New Jersey, where at the age of sixteen Jonsson graduated from Montclair High School. He was a graduate of Rensselaer Polytechnic Institute (RPI), class of 1922 earning a degree in mechanical engineering, where he was a member of Alpha Tau Omega. Jonsson married Margaret Fonde in Knoxville, Tennessee on 8 February 1923 and together they had three children.

=== Business career ===
Jonsson began his career in 1922 at Alcoa as a rolling mill apprentice, and advanced to the position of manufacturing superintendent of an Alcoa subsidiary, the Aluminum Index Company. He held the position from 1923 to 1927. In 1927 he left Alcoa and entered the auto business attempting a Pontiac dealership, returning to Alcoa in 1929 as a sales engineer.

==== Geophysical Service Inc. ====
During Jonsson's last year at Alcoa, J. Clarence Karcher, the husband of Mrs. Jonsson's cousin, occasionally asked Jonsson's assistance with expediting materials orders for a start-up company he had co-founded with petroleum geologists Eugene McDermott and Everette DeGolyer, Geophysical Service Incorporated, a pioneering provider of seismic exploration services to the petroleum industry. In June 1930 Karcher offered Jonsson a job managing the manufacture of seismic instruments at Karcher's company lab in Newark, New Jersey, and in July Jonsson again left Alcoa.

In 1934, Jonsson and his family moved to Dallas, Texas where GSI was now headquartered. Jonsson held the position of secretary of Geophysical Service, which gave him responsibility for all of the accounting, banking, international, legal, manufacturing, personnel, purchasing, and warehousing activities of the company. Jonsson held this position until 1939.

In 1939, the company reorganized as Coronado Corp., an oil company with Geophysical Service Inc (GSI), now as a subsidiary. Jonsson became secretary-treasurer in 1939 as part of the reorganization. On 6 December 1941, Jonsson along with three other GSI employees, Eugene McDermott, Cecil H. Green, and H.B. Peacock purchased GSI. In 1942, he became vice president and treasurer. He held this position until 1951. During World War II, GSI built electronics for the United States Army Signal Corps and the Navy. After the war, GSI continued to produce electronics. The rugged nature of equipment for the oil industry and of military equipment were similar and thus continued expansion into military contracts was a natural progression.

==== Texas Instruments ====
In 1951, the Geophysical Service changed its name to Texas Instruments; GSI becoming a wholly owned subsidiary of the new company. Jonsson became president of Texas Instruments, a position he held until 1958. Jonsson was elected chairman of the board in 1958 and held this position until 1966. He became honorary chairman in 1966 through 1977. Under Jonsson's leadership, TI invented the integrated circuit in 1958, the electronic hand held calculator in 1967, and the single chip microcomputer in 1971.

=== Civic activities ===
Jonsson was a strong advocate for education, serving or leading on the boards of many educational institutions and created alliances to improve local educational facilities. Jonsson was a founder of the Southwest Center for Advanced Studies, which became the University of Texas at Dallas in 1969. Jonsson was the first president of the Dallas Chamber of Commerce, as well as president of the powerful civic group, the Dallas Citizen's Council.

It was Jonsson's unhappy task to take the podium on November 22, 1963, at the former Dallas Trade Mart to inform the waiting crowd of the motorcade shooting of President Kennedy and Governor Connally. Video/audio footage of this briefing exists.

In 1964, shortly after the assassination in Dallas of President John F. Kennedy, Jonsson became mayor of Dallas, Texas on February 3, 1964, completing the term of Mayor Earle Cabell who had resigned to run for Congress. Elected to three additional terms, he worked to improve morale and the image of the city. He initiated Goals for Dallas, a citizen goal-setting program endorsed by the city council and reportedly modeled on the corporate planning system of Texas Instruments. Jonsson pushed through a $175 million bond that financed a new city hall, the Dallas Convention Center and the Dallas Central Library. He was a central leader in the development of Dallas/Fort Worth International Airport, and served as its first board chairman.

Jonsson died of pneumonia at his home on 31 August 1995 and was buried at Dallas's Sparkman Hillcrest Memorial Park. Memorial services attended by several ex-Mayors of Dallas were held for him on September 5 at Dallas's Highland Park United Methodist Church.

== Legacy ==
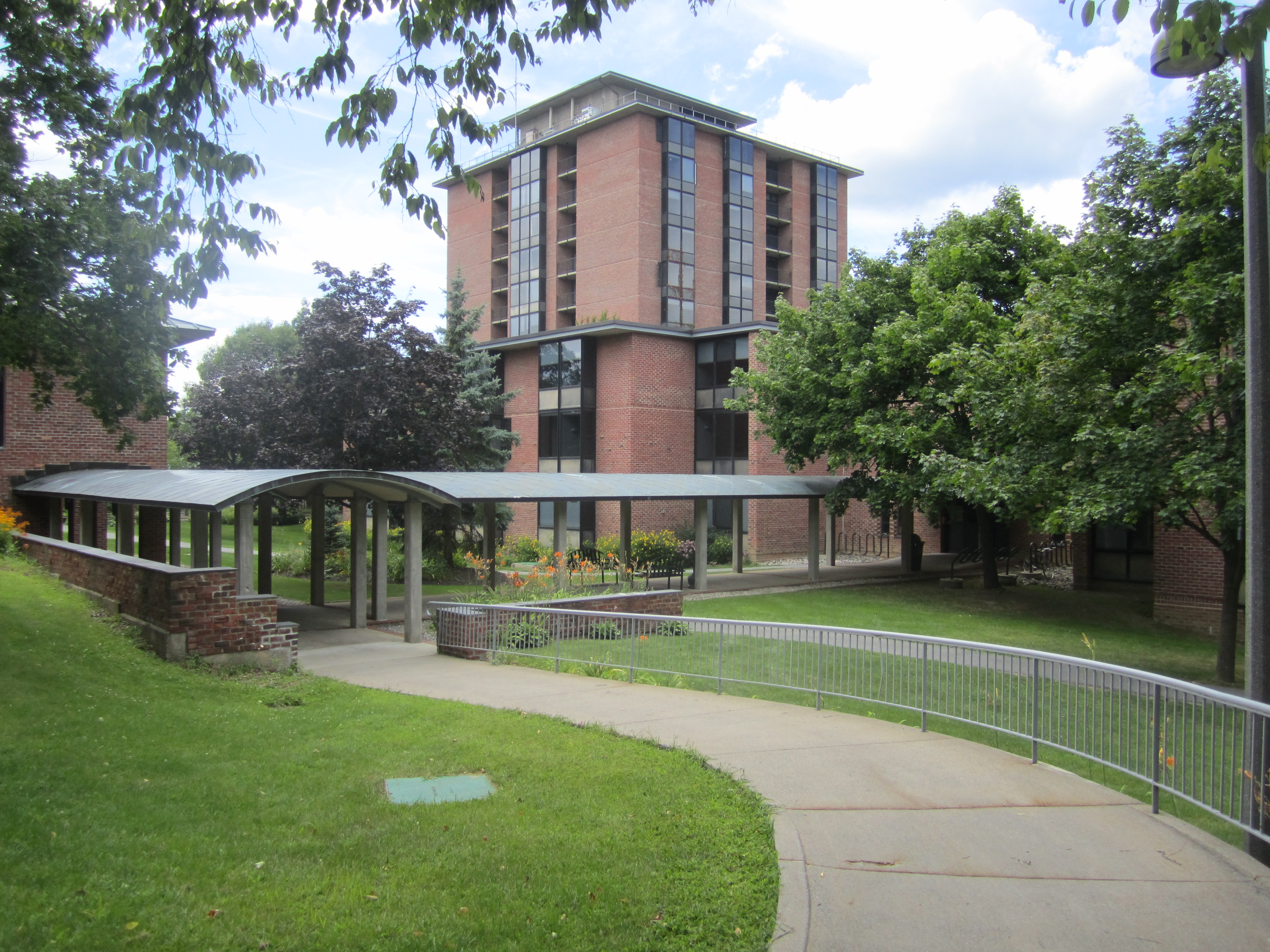
Jonsson Tower, the centerpiece of the Skidmore College campus.

Several facilities bear Jonsson's name in recognition of his contributions. These include the J. Erik Jonsson Central Library in Dallas, and the well-known Erik Jonsson School of Engineering and Computer Science at the University of Texas at Dallas in Richardson. A trustee of Rensselaer Polytechnic Institute, he helped fund major campus improvements, leading the institute to name the Jonsson Engineering Center and Jonsson-Rowland Science Center in his honor. Along with two other founders of Texas Instruments, Cecil H. Green and Eugene McDermott, Jonsson helped found the Excellence in Education Foundation which contributed $30 million to the University of Texas Southwestern Medical Center in 1991. The J. Erik Jonsson Center of the National Academy of Sciences, overlooking Quissett Harbor in Woods Hole on Cape Cod, is also named in honor of Jonsson. He also served as a trustee of Margaret's alma mater Skidmore College in Saratoga Springs, New York. Although founded in 1912, Skidmore started a new 850-acre (3.4 km^{2}) campus of which the Jonssons largely funded construction in the 1960s.

== Awards ==
Jonsson was honored with the Robert Henry Thurston Lecture Award from the American Society of Mechanical Engineers in 1981. Jonsson was awarded the H. Neil Mallon Award by the World Affairs Council in 1987. The H. Neil Mallon Award, hosted by the World Affair Council of Dallas/ Fort Worth, is presented annually to individuals who have excelled at promoting the international focus of North Texas. The prestigious Mallon Award is named after the Council’s founder and is presented annually to individuals who have excelled in promoting the region’s international profile. Funds raised from this event support the World Affair Council’s public and education programming, international exchanges, and diplomatic services.
