= J. Erik Jonsson Central Library =

Library in Dallas, Texas, U.S.

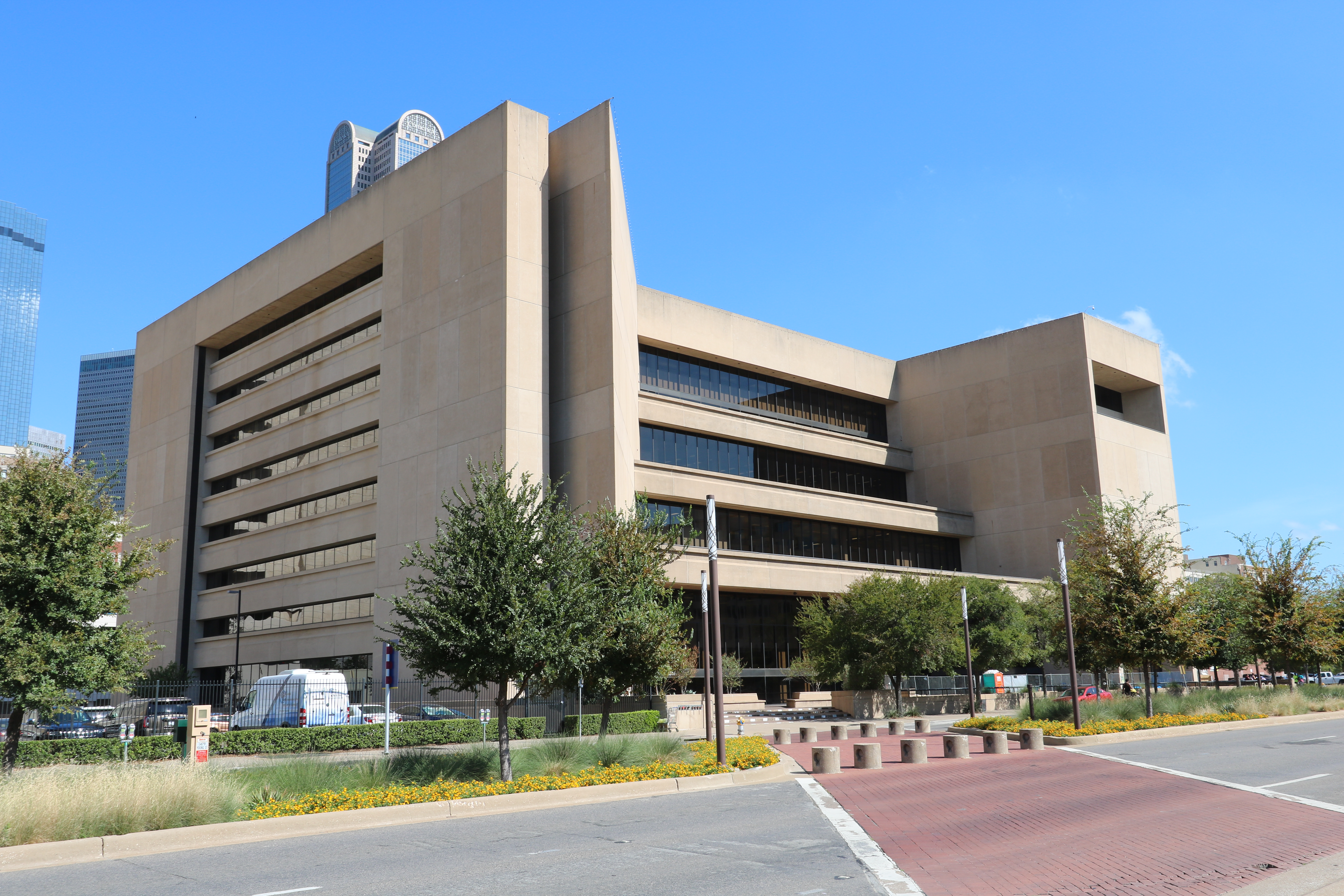
- The J. Erik Jonsson Central Library in 2019
- 32.7786°N 96.7969°W
- Location: 1515 Young Street, Dallas, Texas, U.S.
- Established: April 18, 1982
- Branch of: Dallas Public Library

Other information
- Website: www.dallaslibrary.org/central-library

The J. Erik Jonsson Central Library is the main library of the Dallas Public Library system. It is located at 1515 Young Street in the Government District of downtown Dallas, Texas, United States, directly across from Dallas City Hall.

== History ==
The structure was built to replace the Old Dallas Central Library. The new structure consists of ten stories, eight stories above ground floor and two below ground floor, designed in the modernist architectural style. The design of the nearby Dallas City Hall inspired the design of the library – the library's upper floors are oriented away from Young Street while (symmetrically) the upper floors of City Hall are oriented toward Marilla Street (an open area between Young and Marilla Streets separates the buildings).

It was named for J. Erik Jonsson, a founder of Texas Instruments and former mayor of Dallas and long-time supporter and patron of the library system. He also led the ten-year drive to raise private funds that allowed the construction of a state-of-the-art main library.

During the 2000s the library embarked on a long-range renovation program which updated interior finishes, repaired maintenance issues and created an overall more inviting experience.

== See also ==
- List of buildings and structures in Dallas, Texas
