= Dallas City Hall =

Seat of government in Dallas, Texas, US

- Dallas City Hall

General information
- Type: Municipal Government
- Architectural style: Modern
- Location: 1500 Marilla St, Dallas, TX 75201
- Coordinates: 32.7762360°N 96.7968380°W
- Completed: 1978; 48 years ago

Technical details
- Floor count: 7

Design and construction
- Architects: I.M. Pei; Theodore Musho
- Main contractor: Robert E. McKee, Inc.
- Awards: 1979 Excellence Award, American Consulting Engineers Council

Dallas City Hall is the seat of municipal government of the city of Dallas, Texas, United States. It is located at 1500 Marilla Street in the Government District of downtown Dallas. The current building, the city's fifth city hall, was completed in 1978 and replaced the Dallas Municipal Building.

== History ==
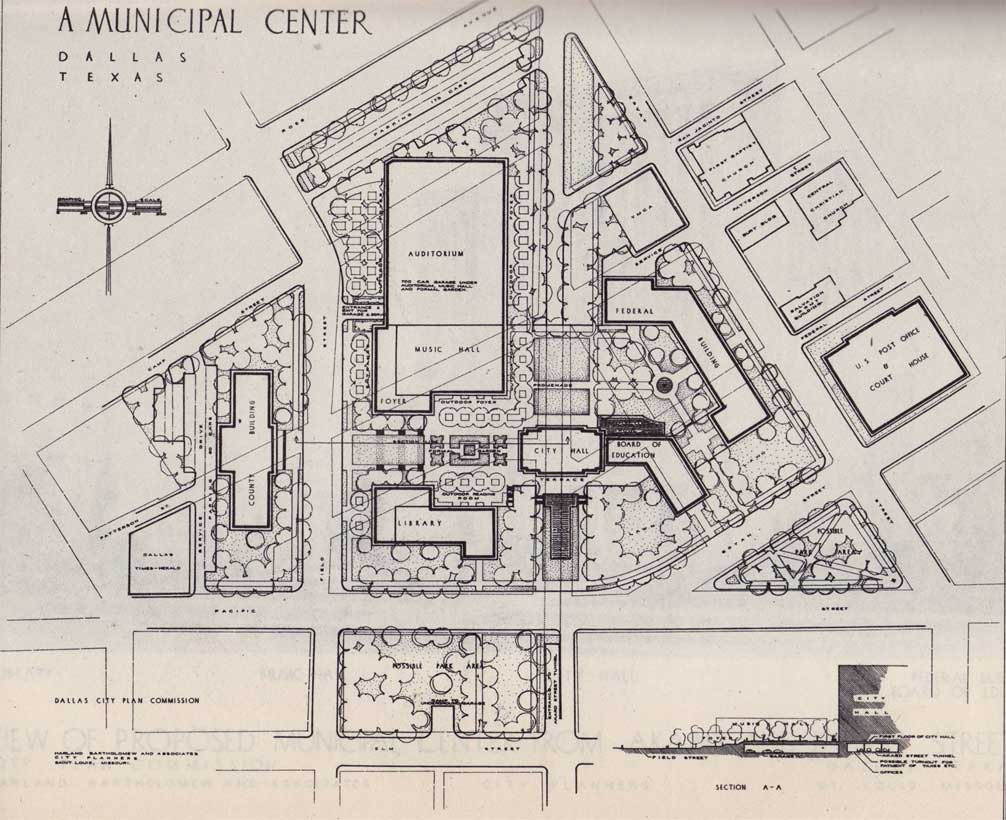
City plans from 1946 called for a grand Beaux-Arts municipal center in Downtown Dallas

The City of Dallas' idea for a centralized municipal center began when city planning consultants Harland Bartholomew & Associates presented their ideas in 1944. The idea was to relocate from the current Dallas Municipal Building to a grand Beaux-Arts complex of city and federal offices, a convention center and cultural facilities. Two sites downtown were possible contenders: one north centered on Federal Street and Akard, and one south centered on Young Street.

Plans proceeded until cost estimates shocked city leaders and the plan was shelved, although land at the southern site was acquired by the city for future use.

The 1963 assassination of President John F. Kennedy turned the world against the city, as Dallas became known as the "City of Hate". Dallas Mayor Erik Jonsson made it a priority to reinvent the city's image, and the Goals for Dallas program was enacted to accomplish this. One of the goals, Design of the city, was summarized by the statement, "We demand a city of beauty and functional fitness that embraces the quality of life for all its people." This was the start of the movement to create a new modern City Hall and municipal center.

Planning for the Dallas Municipal Center commenced in 1964 when the Dallas City Council appointed a Citizen's City Hall Site Committee to select an appropriate location for new municipal administration offices. The mayor was closely involved with the project, and a committee of prominent citizens settled on I.M. Pei to design the new facility.

Construction began on June 26, 1972, under the direction of contractor Robert E. McKee and Pei. The project was completed in three phases. The City accepted the garage parking areas in November 1974; the Park Plaza in May 1976; and the building in December 1977. The cost of design and construction of the building, the Park Plaza and the garage was over $70 million. Controversies arose over cost overruns (the original estimated cost was $42.2 million) and aesthetic issues (was the building too avant-garde?), though most problems were addressed and work moved on to completion.

The first Dallas City Council meeting was held in the building's City Council Chamber on February 1, 1978, and the entire facility was formally opened and dedicated on March 12, 1978.

=== Proposed relocation ===
As of 2024, Dallas City Hall had at least $60 million in pending repairs, however only $14.5 million has been allocated by Dallas City Council for the repairs of all city buildings. In fall 2025, details emerged that the Dallas City Council was considering abandoning and demolishing the building, citing high repair costs and opportunities for downtown redevelopment. City staff had told the council that the building carried millions of dollars in deferred maintenance and proposed moving City Hall elsewhere downtown, freeing the 1500 Marilla Street site for economic development.

The building was designated as "endangered" in June 2026 by the World Monuments Fund. In May 2026, former mayor Mike Rawlings launched Say Yes to Downtown, a campaign he personally funded to build public support for relocating City Hall and redeveloping the site, possibly as an entertainment district that could keep the Dallas Mavericks and Dallas Stars downtown. Opposition to the relocation led to the formation of the Save Dallas City Hall Coalition, which grew into a 501(c)(4) nonprofit and filed a lawsuit against the city in September 2026; its supporters include former mayor Laura Miller, Dallas County commissioner Elba Garcia and Pei's daughter, Liane Pei. On October 2, 2026, the coalition began a 60-day drive to collect about 20,000 signatures from registered voters to place a city charter amendment on the May 2027 ballot that would designate the existing building as the seat of city government unless voters decide otherwise.

== Design ==
When you do a city hall, it has to convey an image of the people, and this had to represent the people of Dallas ... The people I met – rich and poor, powerful and not so powerful – were all very proud of their city. They felt that Dallas was the greatest city there was, and I could not disappoint them.

– I.M. Pei

I.M. Pei's modernist inverted pyramid design is a result of space requirements from city government. Public areas and citizen services required much less space than offices that ran the government and overhanging the upper floors allowed them to be larger than the public spaces below. The building slopes at a 34° angle, with each of the 7 above-grade floors being 9½ feet wider than the one below. This inclined façade interacts with the buildings it faces downtown and provides protection from the weather and Texas sun.

The foundation and basement levels are considerably wider than the apparent footprint of the structure, extending out beneath the inclined facade. The cantilevered roof is 200 feet (61 meters) wide, the ground floor is 126 feet (38 meters) wide, and the basement 230 feet (70 meters) wide. When Mayor Jonsson reacted to the apparent top-heaviness of the building's shape, 3 cylindrical pillars that appear to hold up the structure were created. These contain stairwells that had originally been concealed within the design. These pillars only provide visual support and do not bear the load of the building.

Pei also persuaded the city to acquire an additional 6 acres in front of the building as a plaza and buffer zone for his grand public structure. A 1,325 car parking garage was built beneath the plaza, and the extra income helped supplement the funding of the building.

A buff-colored concrete was chosen for the main building material; its color resembled local earth tones. Since concrete was both the primary structural and finish material, close attention was paid to every aspect of its mix and placement.

The design of Dallas City Hall inspired the J. Erik Jonsson Central Library building located across the street – whereas the upper floors of City Hall are oriented toward Marilla Street, the upper floors of the Central Library are oriented away from Marilla (and, in a form of symmetry, away from City Hall).

=== In film ===
The building features in the RoboCop movies of the 1980s and 1990s, as the Headquarters of the OCP company. Special effects were employed to make the building appear taller than it is.

The building also features in the 1980 TV movie The Lathe of Heaven.

== Facilities ==
- City Hall contained 1,400 workstations when it opened in 1978. It had few floor-to-ceiling walls, using instead five-, six-, and seven-foot-high partitions to create separate offices. The absence of walls allowed employees and visitors to have window views from all areas.
- The second floor of Dallas City Hall is referred to as the Great Court because of its 250-foot (76 m) length and the uninterrupted height to the vaulted ceiling approximately 100 feet (30 m) above.
- The Park Plaza is two blocks long and one block wide and is bounded by Young, Ervay, Marilla and Akard streets. The Plaza includes a 180-foot (55 m)-diameter reflecting pool, a variable-height fountain, park benches and three distinctive 84-foot (26 m)-high flagpoles. The Plaza is landscaped with trees native to Texas: live oaks and red oaks. The reflective pool contains large floating sculptures designed by artist Marta Pan.
- A 16-foot (4.9 m)-high by 24-foot (7.3 m)-wide, three-piece sculpture titled "The Dallas Piece" was designed by Henry Moore for the plaza and resembles vertebrae.
- A state-of-the-art Conference Center that includes a 156-seat auditorium and three conference rooms was recently added to Dallas City Hall.
- A tunnel and station for future rail transit was constructed in the third level basement beneath the parking garage and Marilla Street. This tunnel has remained unused but has been considered for DART's second light rail route through downtown Dallas.

== Gallery ==
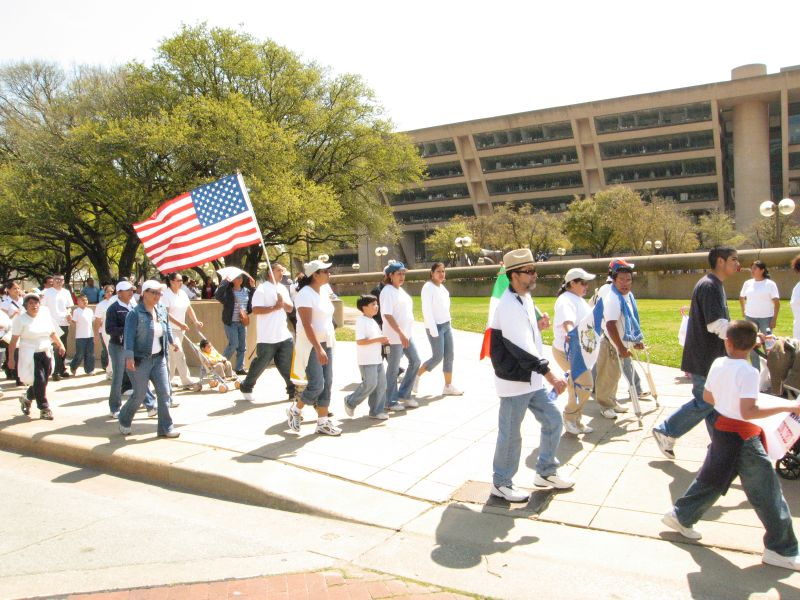
City Hall Plaza is regularly used for marches and protests

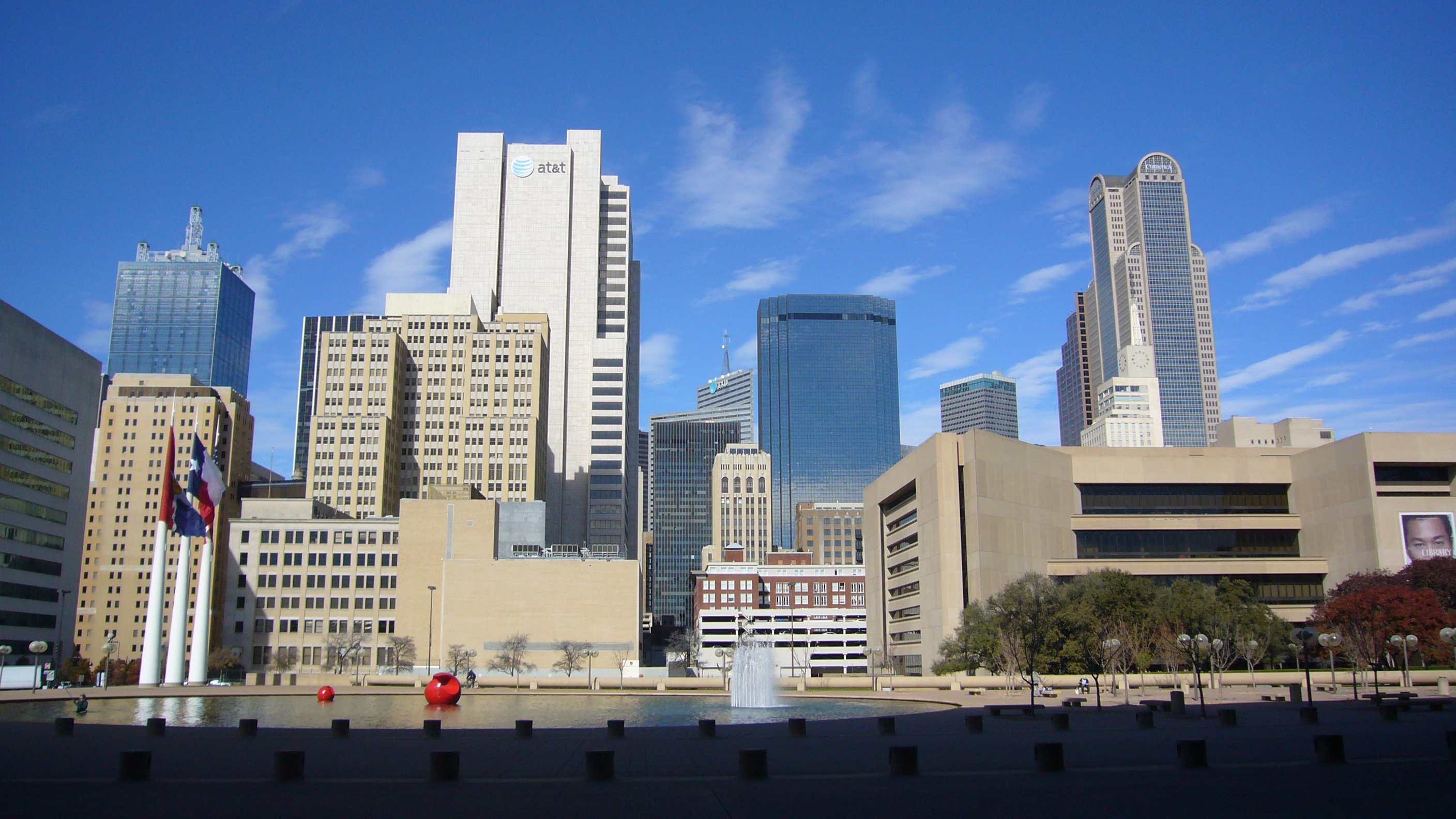
View from City Hall toward downtown

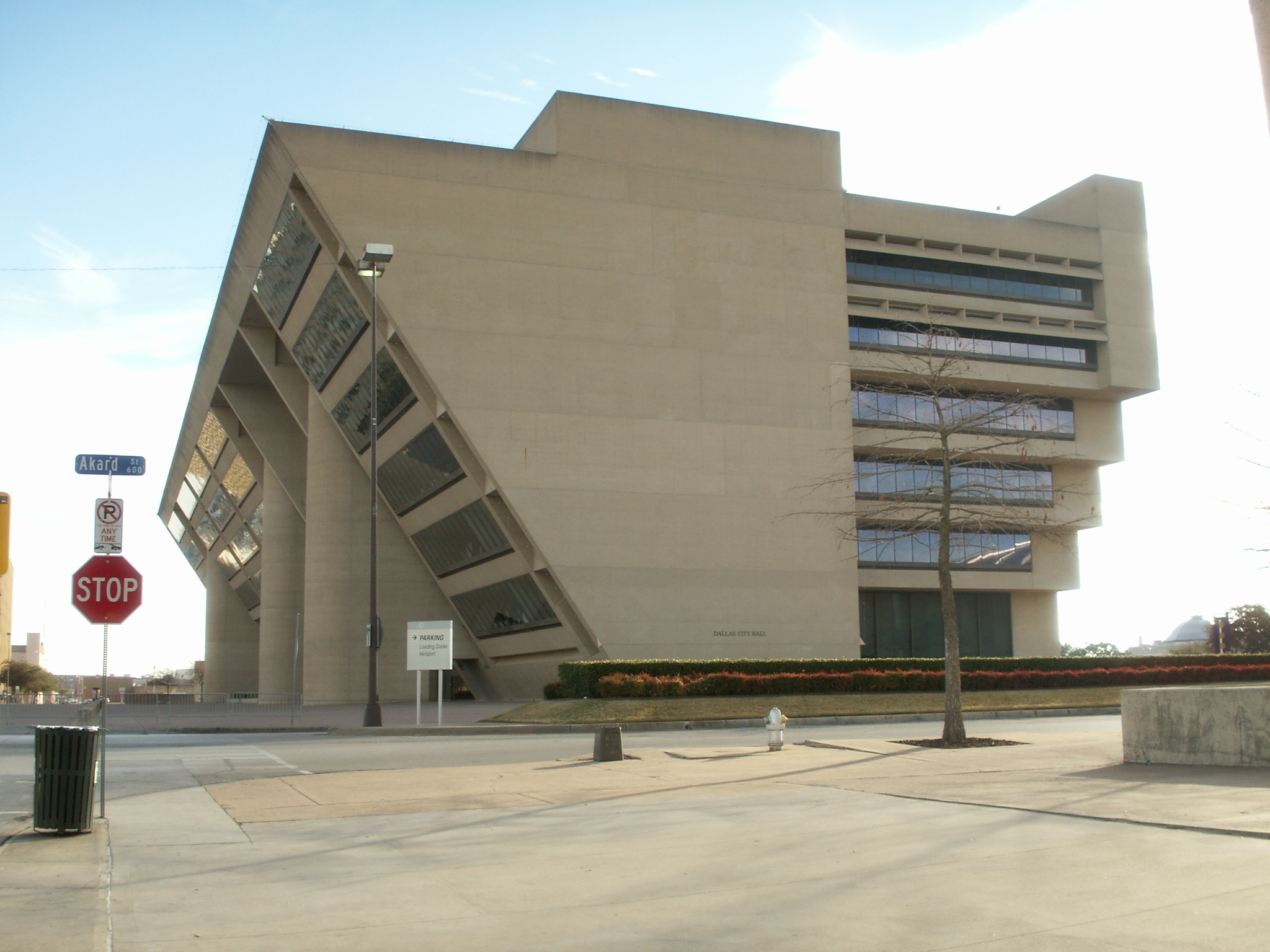
Side view of City Hall

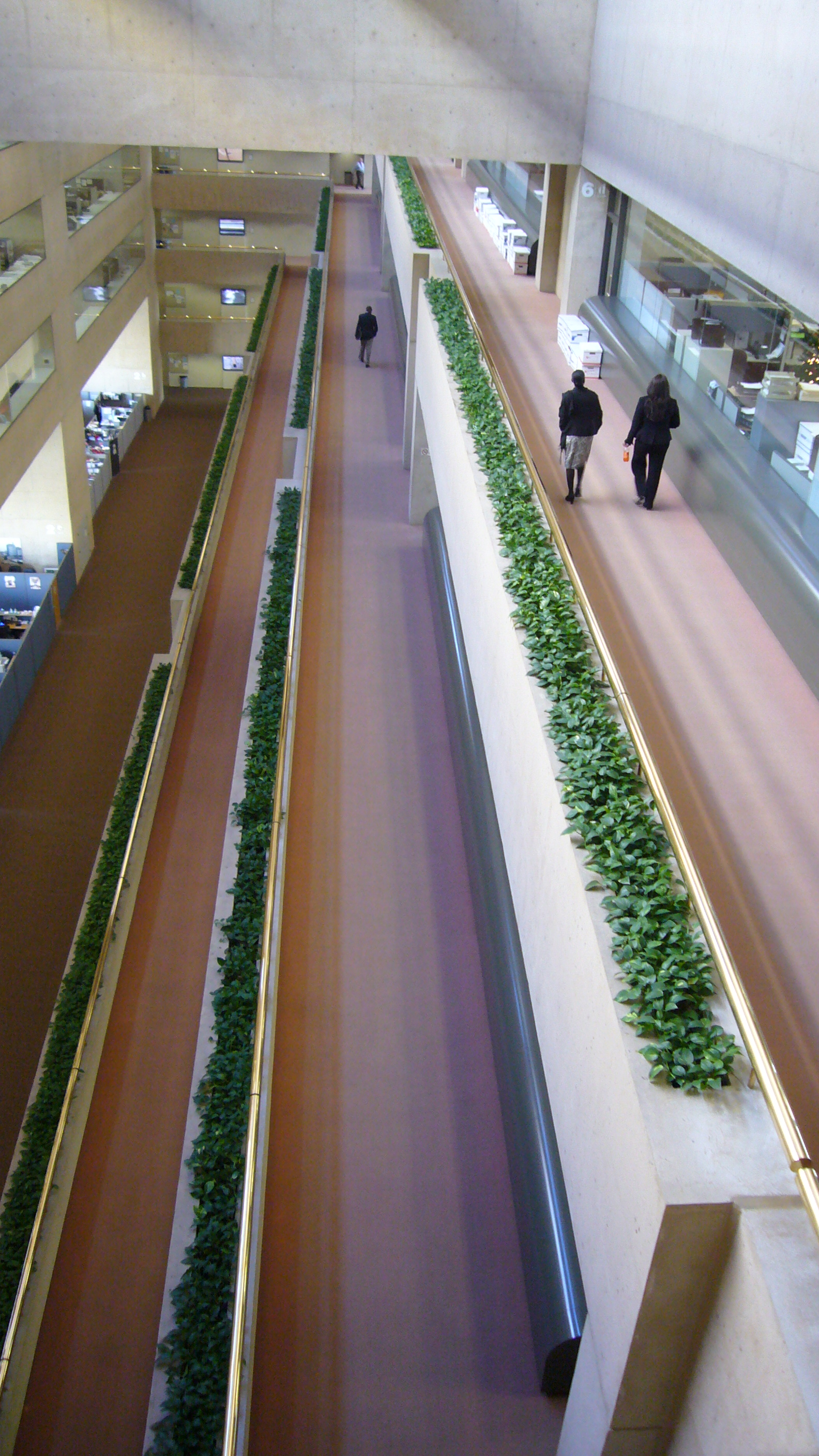
Interior corridors of City Hall

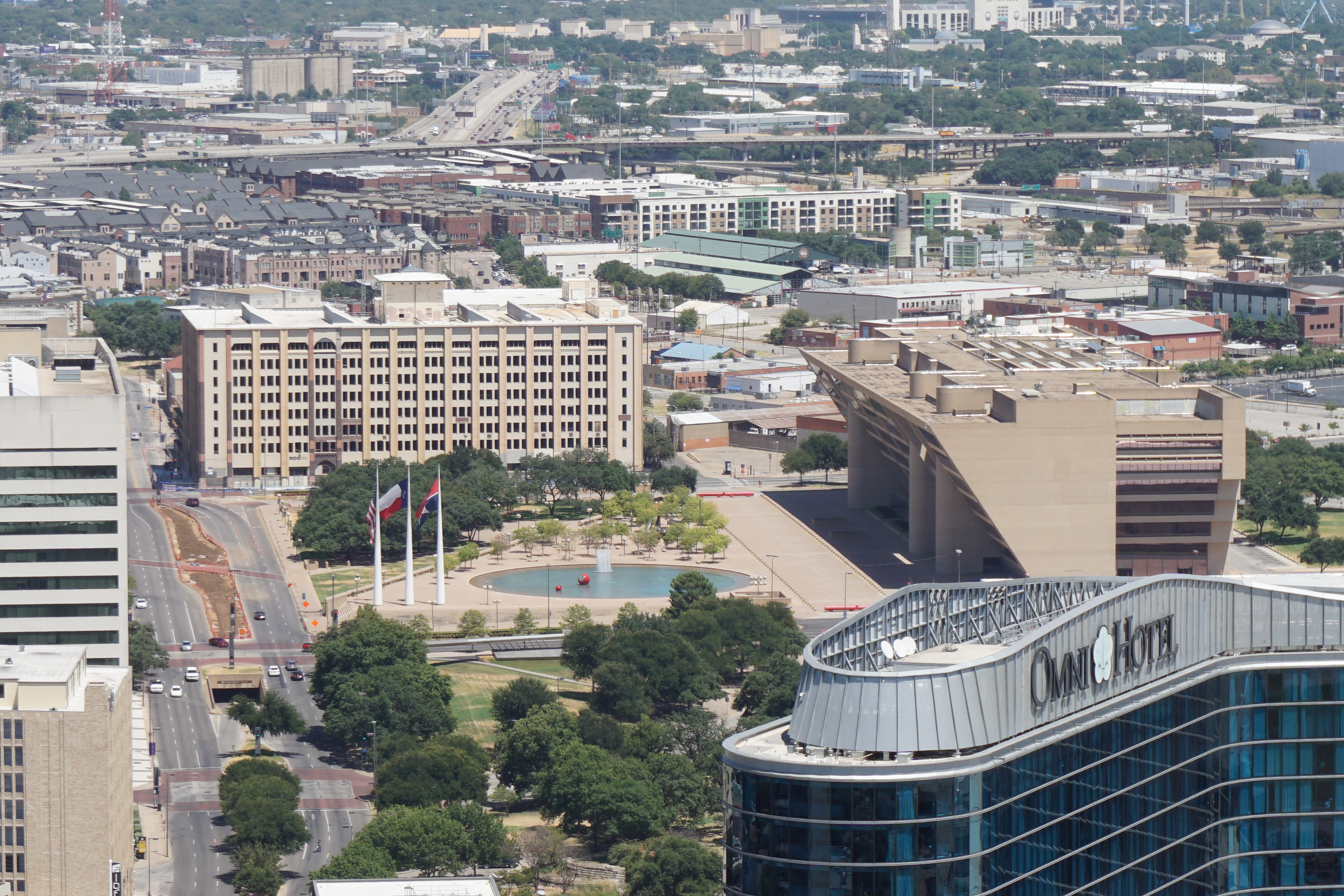
View of City Hall from Reunion Tower
