= Dallas Public Library =

Public library system in Dallas, Texas, U.S.

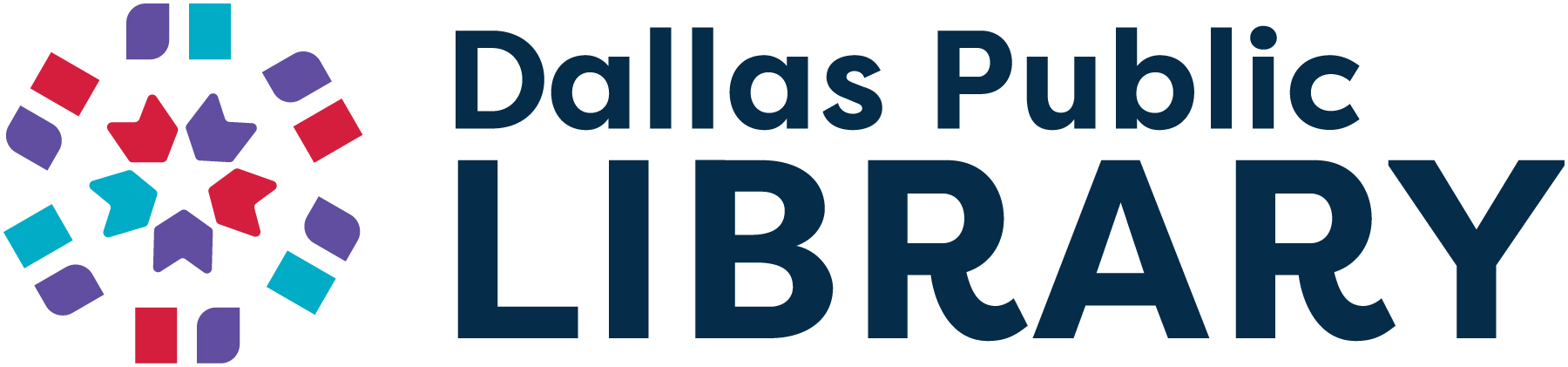

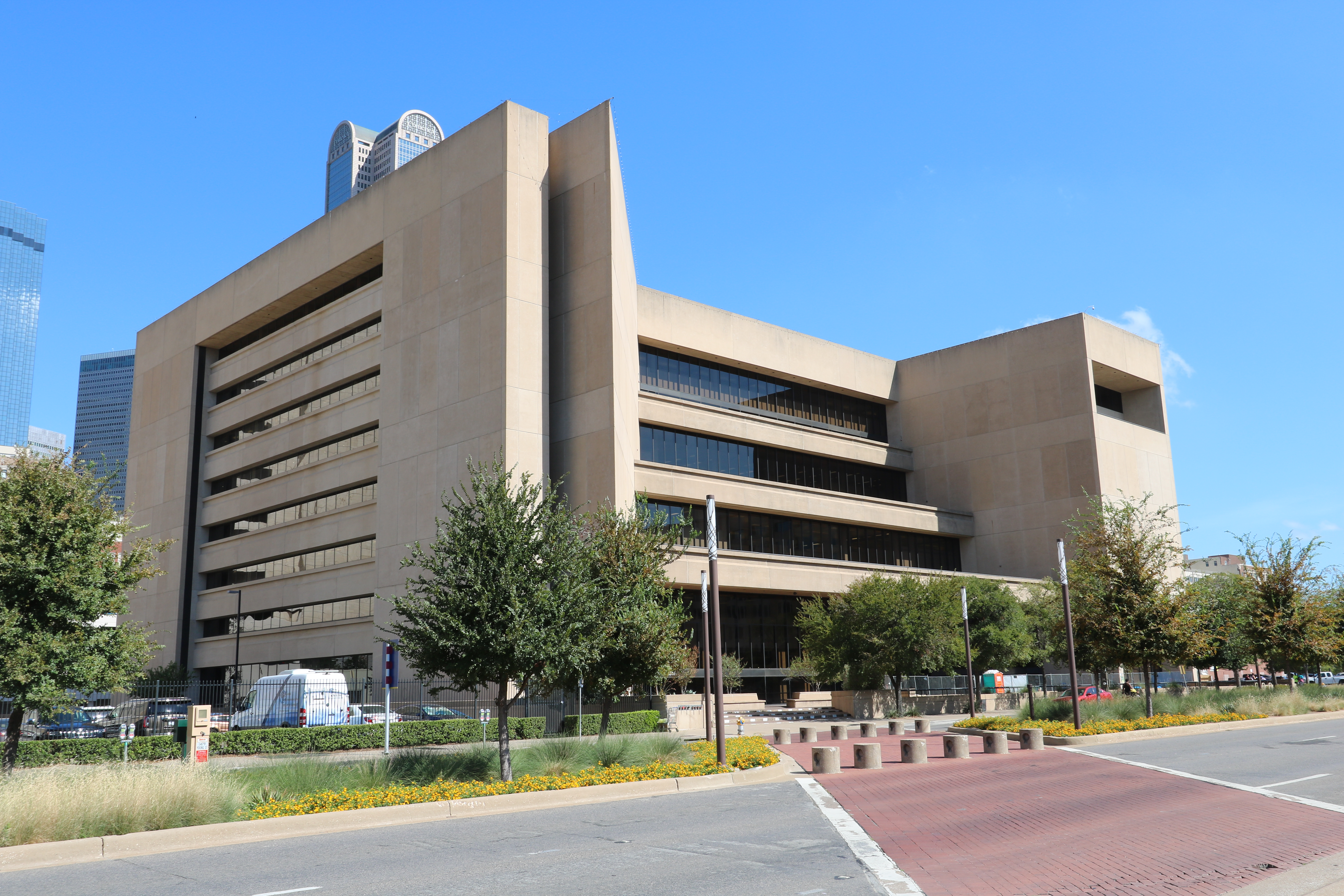
- The J. Erik Jonsson Central Library in 2019
- Location: 1515 Young Street, Dallas, Texas 75201, United States
- Type: Public
- Established: 1982
- Branches: 30

Collection
- Size: 4,972,494

Access and use
- Circulation: 10,236,949
- Population served: 1,317,210 (2024)

Other information
- Budget: $43,489,755 (FY 2023-24)
- Director: Manya Shorr
- Employees: 346.7 FTE
- Website: www.dallaslibrary.org

The Dallas Public Library (DPL) is the public library system that serves the city of Dallas, Texas, United States. With more than 4 million items and 30 locations, the Downtown Dallas Public Library is the largest public library system in North Texas.

A Dallas Public Library card is available at no cost to anyone who lives in, teaches at or attends school in an educational institution within City of Dallas city limits. Educational institutions include public schools, charter schools, private schools, community colleges, colleges and universities, etc. A library card is also available to City of Dallas employees.

The monthly average in total numbers from all 30 Dallas Public Library locations are 648,840 items circulated (digital & physical), 3,398 new library cards, 628 technology checkouts (wi-fi hotspots & laptops), 679 volunteer hours, 120,058 online visitors. As of fiscal year 2023, the library had 643,892 card holders with 3,925,173 physical materials circulated and 3,889,401 e-materials circulated.

== Special collections and services ==
Several special collections are housed at the J. Erik Jonsson Central Library including the Siddie Jo Johnson Children's Literature Collection (2nd floor), the Patent and Trademark Resource Center (6th floor), the Fine Books collection (7th floor), and the Lloyd DeWitt Bockstruck Genealogy Collection (8th floor). Dallas Public Library holds one of the largest and comprehensive collections for family history research in the Southwest. Many of the library branches hold special book collections like Spanish language, LGBT Resources, and African-American history.

=== Historic Documents ===
The Dallas Public Library is home to a copy of Shakespeare's First Folio, the only copy in a US public library outside of New England. It was purchased by the Dallas Shakespeare Club in 1984 at a cost of $275,000 and was gifted to the Library in 1986. It is displayed on the 7th floor.

A Dunlap Broadside copy of the Declaration of Independence is also housed on the 7th floor. Printed by John Dunlap of Philadelphia, it is one of only twenty-six known to survive. This is the only copy west of the Mississippi, and one of only 3 displayed by a public library. It was purchased by a number of individuals for $500,000 and given to the city.

=== Makerspaces ===
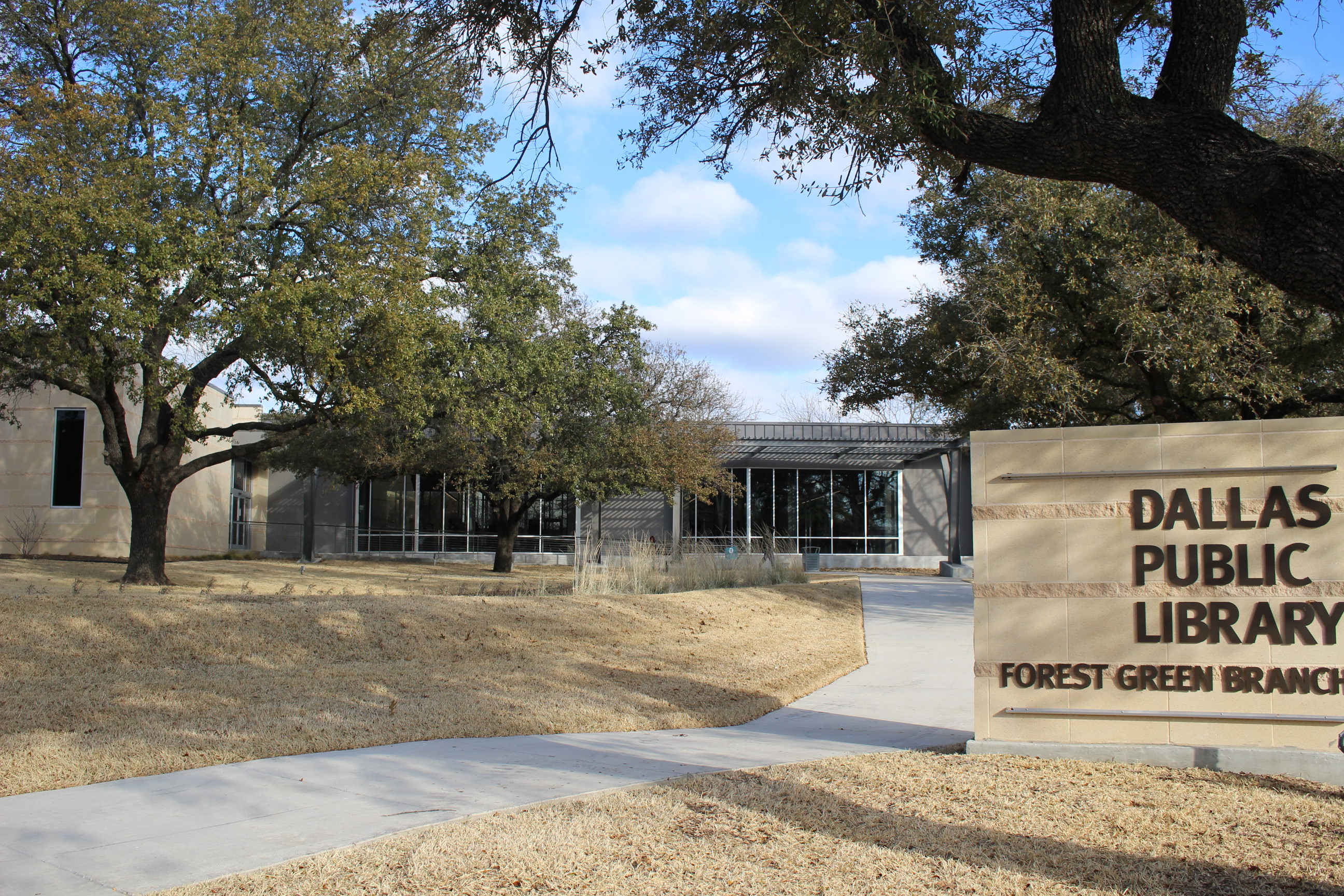
Forest Green Branch Library

The J. Erik Jonsson Central Library also has three makerspaces, called Creative Spaces, that serve a different creative endeavor: storytelling, fiber arts, and preservation. The Story Center on the 3rd floor is a studio with equipment for storytelling in all its forms: recording a podcast, making movies, or digital creation. The Fiber Arts Workroom on the 4th floor offers equipment to help people of all skill levels bring their ideas into finished projects. The Heritage Lab on the 8th floor contains digitization tools to make copies of irreplaceable photos, home movies, documents, slides and audio cassettes. In 2024, D Magazine named Dallas Public Library best arts incubator in the city.

=== Services ===
GED and Citizenship classes are available throughout the year in English and Spanish through the Adult Learning program. In person and online English classes are also available. Job application, search, and resume help is available through the library's Career Launch Pad service. The service is available at all Dallas Public Library locations except for Bookmarks. Notary services are offered at no charge at several locations.

== History ==
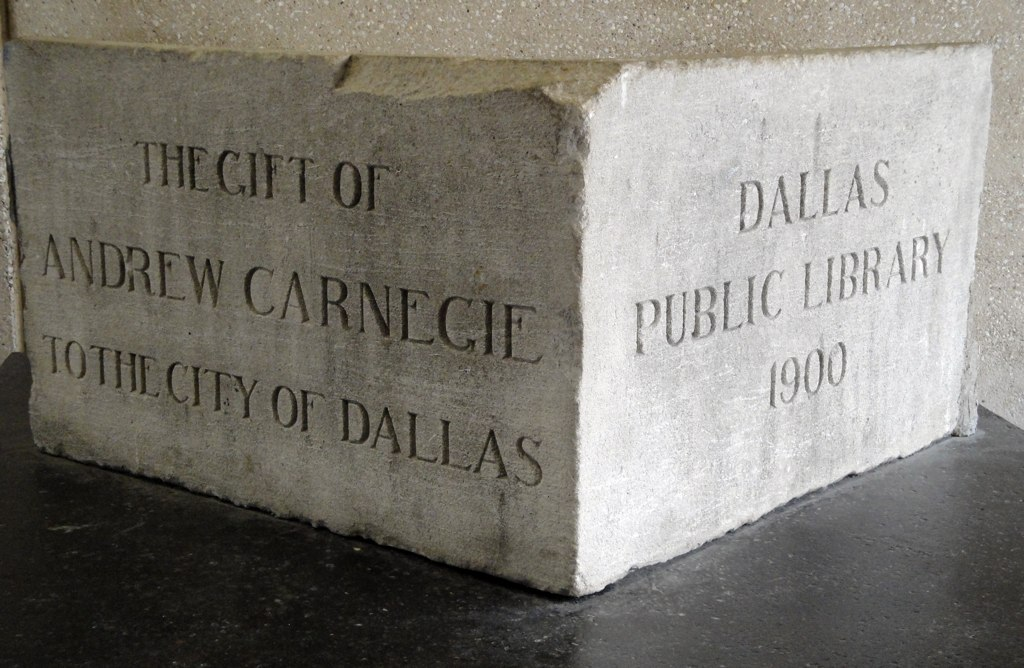
The cornerstone of the old Carnegie Library, which was demolished in 1954

In 1899, the idea to create a free public library in Dallas was conceived by the Dallas Federation of Women's Clubs, led by president Mrs. Henry (May Dickson) Exall. She helped raise US$11,000 from gifts from public school teachers, local businessmen, and Alfred Horatio Belo of The Dallas Morning News.

The library became a reality when Mrs. Exall requested and received a US$50,000 grant from philanthropist and steel giant Andrew Carnegie to construct the first library building in Dallas. On October 22, 1901, the Carnegie library opened at the corner of Harwood and Commerce streets with a head librarian, three assistants, and 9,852 volumes. The first story held the entire collection; the second floor held the Carnegie Hall auditorium and an Art Room. The art room was the first public art gallery in Dallas and eventually became what is known today as the Dallas Museum of Art.

An Oak Cliff branch opened in 1914 to serve the citizens of the area, annexed into Dallas in 1903. Four more branches opened in the 1930s including the Paul Lawrence Dunbar Library, which was the first to serve the African American population of Dallas. This began under the director of Cleora Clanton.

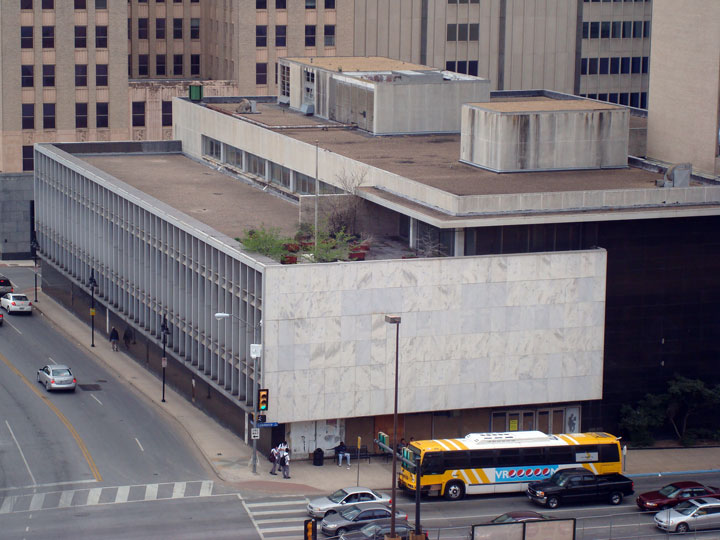
The modern Dallas Public Library building opened in 1954 and included controversial artwork

In World War II, the library was fully established as a War Information Center. By 1950, the library resources and facilities were stretched to the limit, so supporters formed an auxiliary organization called the Friends of the Dallas Public Library to lobby for better library services.

By the 1950s, the Carnegie Library was badly deteriorating and overcrowded, and a new modern library was built on the same site. During construction, the Library was housed temporarily on the mezzanine of Union Station. The new building, now known as Old Dallas Central Library, had room for over 400,000 volumes and opened in 1954.

=== Growth: 1960 to 2000 ===
During the 1960s and 1970s, the Dallas Public Library added 17 branches to the system. In 1962, Lillian M. Bradshaw was named Library Director, the first woman to head a department in the City of Dallas, marking a milestone in the civil rights and women's liberation movements of that era.

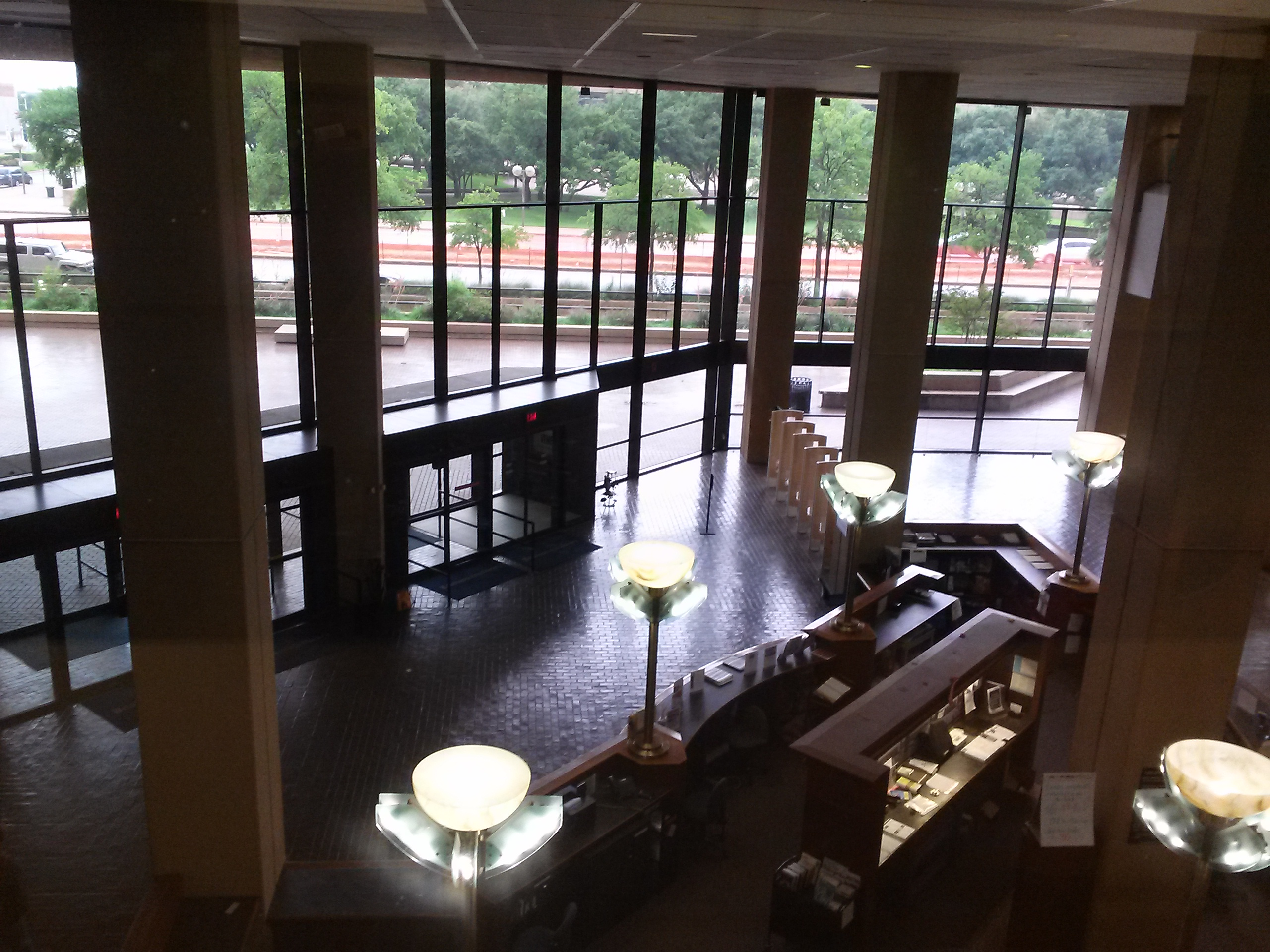
The J. Erik Jonsson Central Library in the Government District of Downtown Dallas

Days after she was put into office, she faced a censorship push from a Dallas council-member, but the community and media rallied to her defense. The City Council, in response, overwhelmingly approved her appointment and passed a resolution not to censor books purchased by the library. By the 1970s, the Central Library had again become overloaded and was unequipped to handle emerging technology. (This was partly a result of the federal Library Services and Construction Act, which had enabled the addition of an unexpected number of volumes to the collection in a relatively short period of time.) In 1972, the City selected a 114,000 square feet (10,600 m^{2}) site at Young and Ervay across from the Dallas City Hall for a new central library facility.

In 1982, the technologically sophisticated structure opened its doors. It was one of the first libraries in the nation to include an Online Public Access Catalog (OPAC) and state-of-the-art audiovisual capabilities. It was renamed the J. Erik Jonsson Central Library in 1986 in honor of the former mayor who played a large role in the library system's development.

By the 2000s, the system had 27 branch locations with over 2.5 million volumes, including books, magazines, videos, and cassettes. The system currently attracts 2.8 million visitors per year and has 540,000 cardholders who check out more than 3.8 million books and other materials per year. The Library also operates a "Library on Wheels" Mobile Learning Center to service Dallas communities.

== Central and Branches ==
List of Dallas Public Libraries by materials circulation (FY26-YTD)
| Library | Circulation | Region |
|---|---|---|
| Central | 297,550 | Downtown Dallas |
| Fretz Park | 244,163 | Far North Dallas |
| Lakewood | 231,529 | East Dallas |
| Audelia Road | 209,448 | Northeast Dallas |
| Preston Royal | 194,302 | North Dallas |
| Lochwood | 153,412 | East Dallas |
| Renner Frankford | 128,354 | Far North Dallas |
| Hampton Illinois | 126,766 | South Dallas |
| North Oak Cliff | 98,662 | South Dallas |
| Timberglen | 89,108 | Far North Dallas |
| Forest Green | 87,584 | Northeast Dallas |
| White Rock Hills | 87,387 | East Dallas |
| Park Forest | 65,973 | Northwest Dallas |
| Prairie Creek | 55,785 | East Dallas |
| Vickery Park | 55,734 | Northeast Dallas |
| Mountain Creek | 51,597 | Southwest Dallas |
| Dallas West | 48,360 | West Dallas |
| Bachman Lake | 44,486 | Northwest Dallas |
| Polk Wisdom | 37,793 | South Dallas |
| Skyline | 33,718 | East Dallas |
| Arcadia Park | 32,238 | Southwest Dallas |
| Arcadia Park | 32,238 | Southwest Dallas |
| Bookmarks | 31,309 | North Dallas |
| Pleasant Grove | 30,141 | Southwest Dallas |
| Kleberg Rylie | 29,681 | Southeast Dallas |
| Highland Hills | 23,568 | South Dallas |
| Martin Luther King, Jr. | 21,661 | South Dallas |
| Grauwyler Park | 19,121 | Northwest Dallas |

The Dallas Public Library system consists of 28 branches throughout the city, the J. Erik Jonsson Central Library, in the Government District of downtown Dallas, and the Bookmarks Children's Library located in NorthPark Center.

Since its inauguration at the beginning of the 20th century, Dallas has built, renovated, and even removed, only to recreate nearby, a library to replace another that no longer exists. A high percentage of Dallas residents vote in public elections in support of the city's libraries, authorizing millions in bonds to fund Dallas Public Library improvements.

- Arcadia Park Branch Library (2005)
- Audelia Road Branch Library (1971)
- Bachman Lake Branch Library (1961)
- Bookmarks in NorthPark Center (2008)
- Dallas West Branch Library (1975)
- Fretz Park Branch Library (1976)
- Forest Green Branch Library (1976)
- Grauwyler Park Branch Library (2007)
- Hampton-Illinois Branch Library (1964)
- Highland Hills Branch Library (1980)
- J. Erik Jonsson Central Library (1982)
- Kleberg-Rylie Branch Library (1995)
- Lakewood Branch Library (1938)
- Lochwood Branch Library (1964)
- Martin Luther King Jr. Branch Library (1974)
- Mountain Creek Branch Library (1994)
- North Oak Cliff Branch Library (1987)
- Oak Lawn Branch Library (1929)
- Park Forest Branch Library (1971)
- Paul Laurence Dunbar Lancaster-Kiest Branch Library (1964)
- Pleasant Grove Branch Library (1961)
- Polk-Wisdom Branch Library (1970)
- Prairie Creek Branch Library (2010)
- Preston Royal Branch Library (1964)
- Renner Frankford Branch Library (1987)
- Skyline Branch Library (1977)
- Timberglen Branch Library (2007)
- Vickery Park Branch Library (2021)
- White Rock Hills Branch Library (2012)

== See also ==
- Libraries in Dallas, Texas
