= Government District, Dallas =

Neighborhood in Dallas, Texas

Coordinates: 32.777°N 96.797°W

Government District
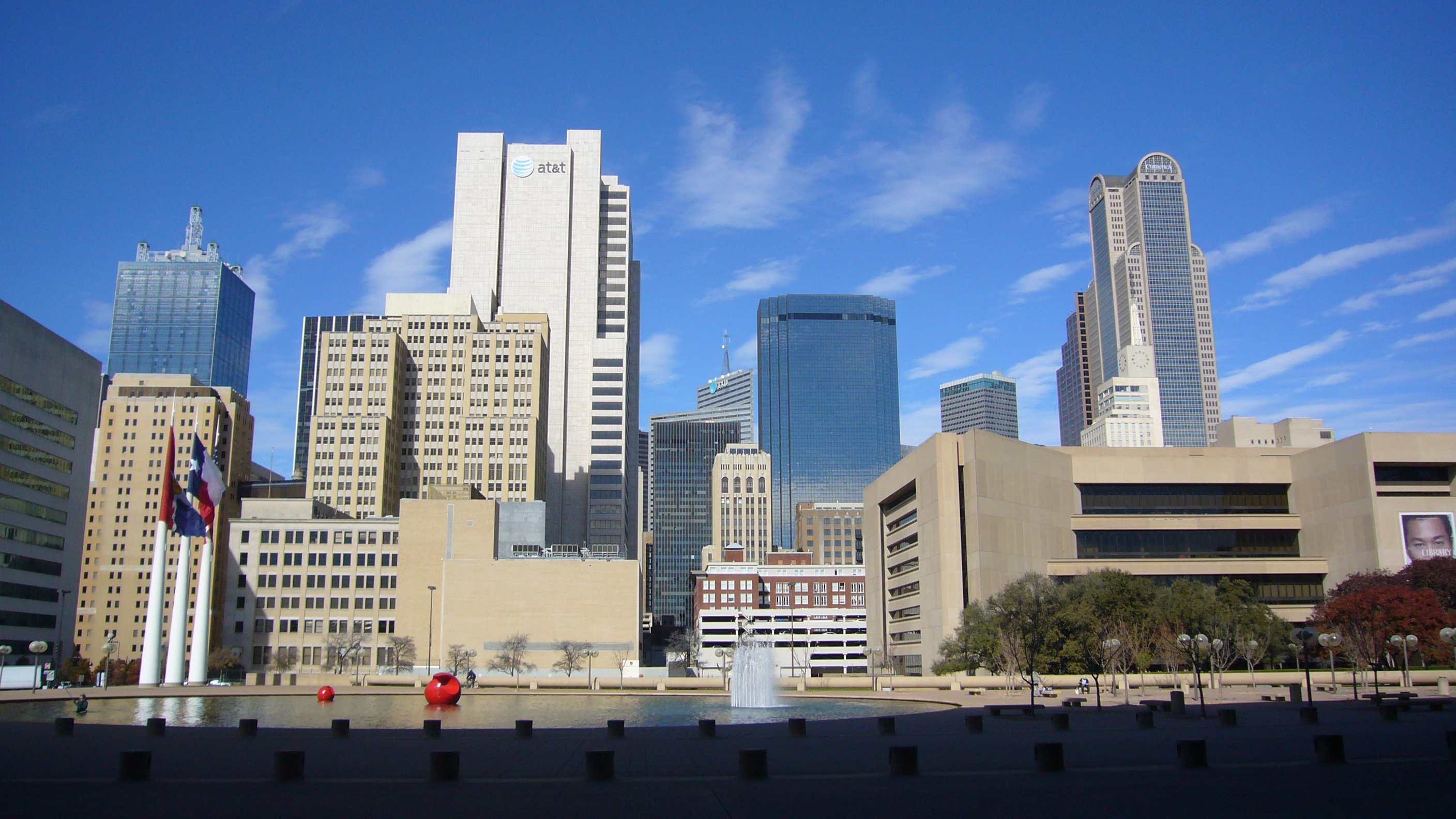
- View of the Government District from City Hall Plaza

- Location in Dallas
- Country: United States
- State: Texas
- Counties: Dallas
- City: Dallas
- Area: Downtown
- Elevation: 430 ft (130 m)
- ZIP code: 75201, 75202
- Area codes: 214, 469, 972

The Government District is an area in south-central downtown Dallas, Texas, US. It lies south of the Main Street District, southeast of the West End Historic District, north of the Convention Center District, west of the Farmers Market District, and east of the Reunion District.

== Notable structures ==
The district is home to Dallas City Hall, the J. Erik Jonsson Central Library, and several other local, regional, state, and federal government buildings. The United States District Court for the Northern District of Texas, which exercises original jurisdiction over 100 counties in North and West Texas, convenes in the Earle Cabell Federal Building and Courthouse in the district. The same building additionally houses United States Bankruptcy and Magistrate Courts and a United States Attorney office. The historic Santa Fe Freight Terminal also lies in this district, stretching from Young to Commerce Street.

== Education ==
The district is zoned to schools in the Dallas Independent School District.

Residents of the district are zoned to City Park Elementary School, Billy Earl Dade Middle School, and James Madison High School.
