= Geophysical Service =

American oil and gas exploration company

Geophysical Service Inc.
- Founded: 1930; 96 years ago
- Headquarters: Dallas, Texas, U.S.
- Website: www.geophysicalservice.com

Geophysical Service Inc. (GSI) was an American company founded by John Clarence Karcher and Eugene McDermott in 1930, for the purpose of using refraction and reflection seismology to explore for petroleum deposits. It was headquartered in Dallas, Texas, United States.

== History ==
On December 6, 1941, the company was purchased by Eugene McDermott, Cecil Howard Green, J. Erik Jonsson, and H.B. Peacock. During World War II, the company produced submarine detection devices. In 1951, the company was renamed Texas Instruments (TI) with GSI as a division. GSI was later sold by TI, repurchased, and finally sold again to Halliburton in 1988. Halliburton also acquired GeoSource, a competing geophysical contractor (formerly Petty-Ray Geophysical), and attempted to merge the two companies. However, the rivalry between the two entities endured and the merged entity known as Halliburton Geophysical Services (HGS) was not profitable. After several years of losses, in 1994, Halliburton sold HGS to Western Atlas (formerly Western Geophysical until its merger with Dresser Atlas in 1987). Western Atlas was bought by Baker Hughes in 1998 and then merged into WesternGeco in 2000 through a joint venture with Schlumberger in which Schlumberger held the majority share (70%).

On July 3, 1981, MS Arctic Explorer, chartered to GSI to conduct seismic surveys off the Labrador coast for British Petroleum, sank off St. Anthony, Newfoundland, in the Strait of Belle Isle, resulting in the loss of 13 lives.

== Present day operations ==
In 1992, Davey Einarsson, a longtime executive of the original GSI, purchased the proprietary rights to GSI’s speculative data in the Canadian offshore, launching the new GSI in Calgary. Paul Einarsson is the COO and Chairman of Geophysical Service Incorporated. He joined the company in 1997.

GSI is the largest owner of marine seismic data in Canada, with its head office located in Calgary, Alberta.

In 2013, GSI was involved in several cases of litigation for damages over disclosure of its confidential seismic data. The court challenges included litigation with the Canada-Newfoundland Offshore Petroleum Board, the Canada-Nova Scotia Offshore Petroleum Board, and companies that had obtained GSI data from a third party or government.

== See also ==
- List of oilfield service companies
