= History of Dallas (1946–1974) =

The history of Dallas, Texas, United States, from 1946 to 1974 concerns the city during the mid-20th century.

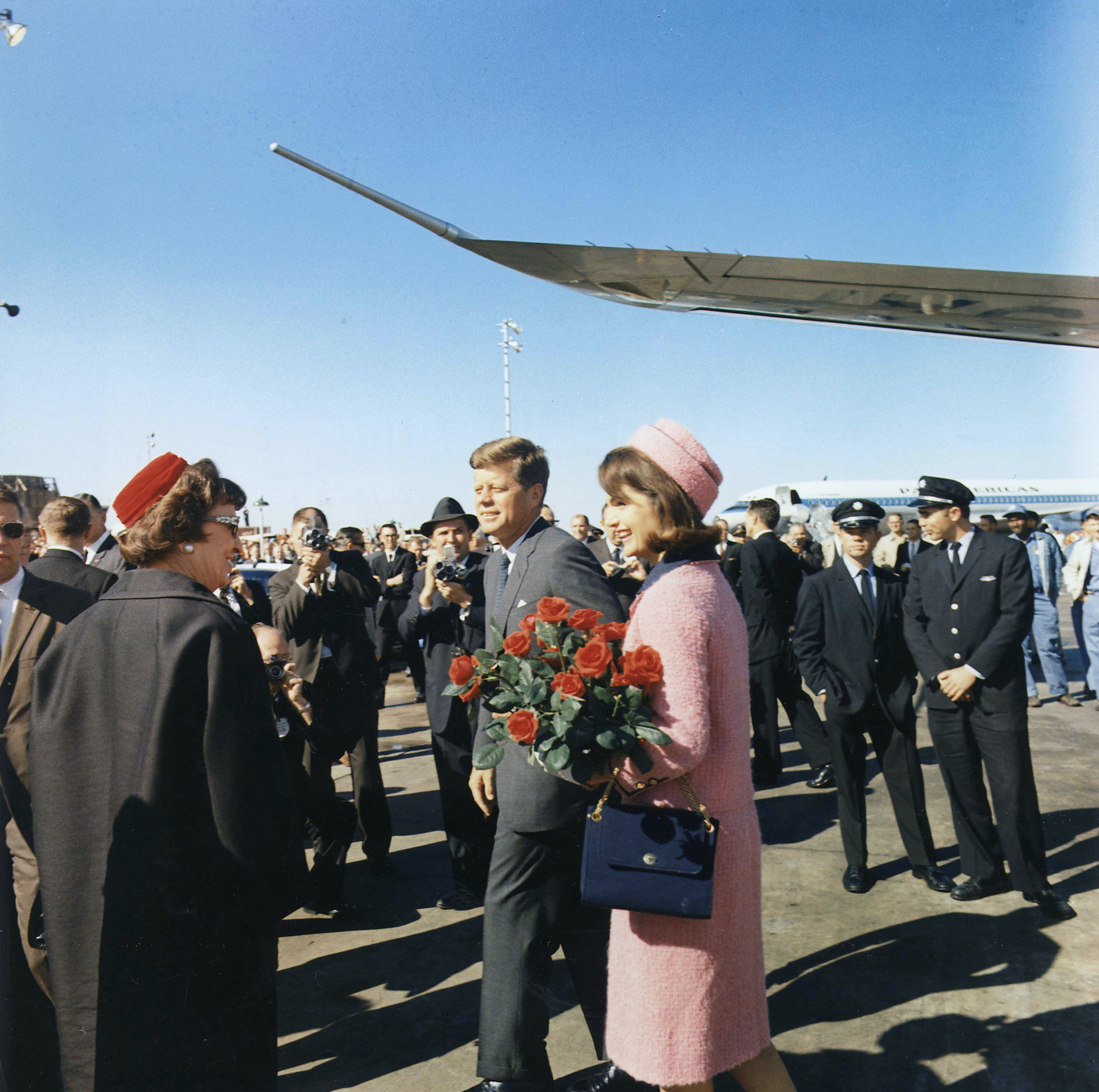
President Kennedy and his wife Jackie arriving at Love Field, Dallas, Texas, 22 November 1963

== Technology ==
In 1958 a version of the integrated circuit was invented in Dallas by Jack Kilby of Texas Instruments; this event punctuated the Dallas area's development as a center for high-technology manufacturing (though the technology Mr. Kilby developed was soon usurped by a competing technology simultaneously developed in the "Silicon Valley" in California by engineers who would go on to form Intel Corporation). During the 1950s and 1960s, Dallas became the nation's third-largest technology center, with the growth of such companies as Ling-Temco-Vought (LTV Corporation) and Texas Instruments.

== Development ==
In 1957, developers Trammell Crow and John M. Stemmons, opened a Home Furnishings Mart that grew into the Dallas Market Center, the largest wholesale trade complex in the world. The same year, the Dallas Memorial Auditorium (now the Dallas Convention Center) opened near Canton and Akard Streets in what is now the Convention Center District of downtown.

== School Desegregation ==
Dallas leaders struggled to avoid national disgrace that followed the defiance to desegregation in Little Rock, Arkansas in 1957. Legal procedures dragged on slowly. Initial progress stalled for five years, but the turmoil in Little Rock prompted Dallas leaders to quietly prepare for integration. In 1961, token desegregation began; busing started in 1971 after federal courts ruled for it in Swann v. Charlotte-Mecklenburg Board of Education. Though flawed, the policy remained in effect. A new plan was implemented in 1976 restricted busing to fourth through eighth grades while empowering minority administrators. Despite these adjustments, white flight continued, reducing the white student population to just 7 percent in Dallas by 2003. By 1983, busing was widely regarded as unsuccessful, having failed to improve minority student outcomes. As a result, the focus shifted to educational reforms, yet ongoing district leadership challenges and racial tensions prolonged litigation until 2003.

== Kennedy assassination ==
On November 22, 1963, United States President John F. Kennedy was assassinated on Elm Street while his motorcade passed through Dealey Plaza in downtown Dallas. Texas Governor John Connally was seriously wounded by the first bullet to hit Kennedy but survived.
