= JDB =

JDB may refer to:

- The petitioner in J.D.B. v. North Carolina, a 2011 U.S.Supreme Court juvenile's rights case
- Dallas CBD Vertiport, by IATA airport code
- Java debugger, a tool included in the Java Development Kit
- JDB Group (加多宝), a Chinese drink producer
- James Dean Bradfield, musician and frontman of Welsh rock band Manic Street Preachers
- Japan Development Bank, a Japanese Bank, one of the predecessors of Development Bank of Japan
- Johnny's Dance Band, a popular Philadelphia-area band in the late 1970s and early 1980s.
