= Farmers Market, Dallas =

Agricultural market in Texas, U.S.

Coordinates: 32°46′39″N 96°47′22″W

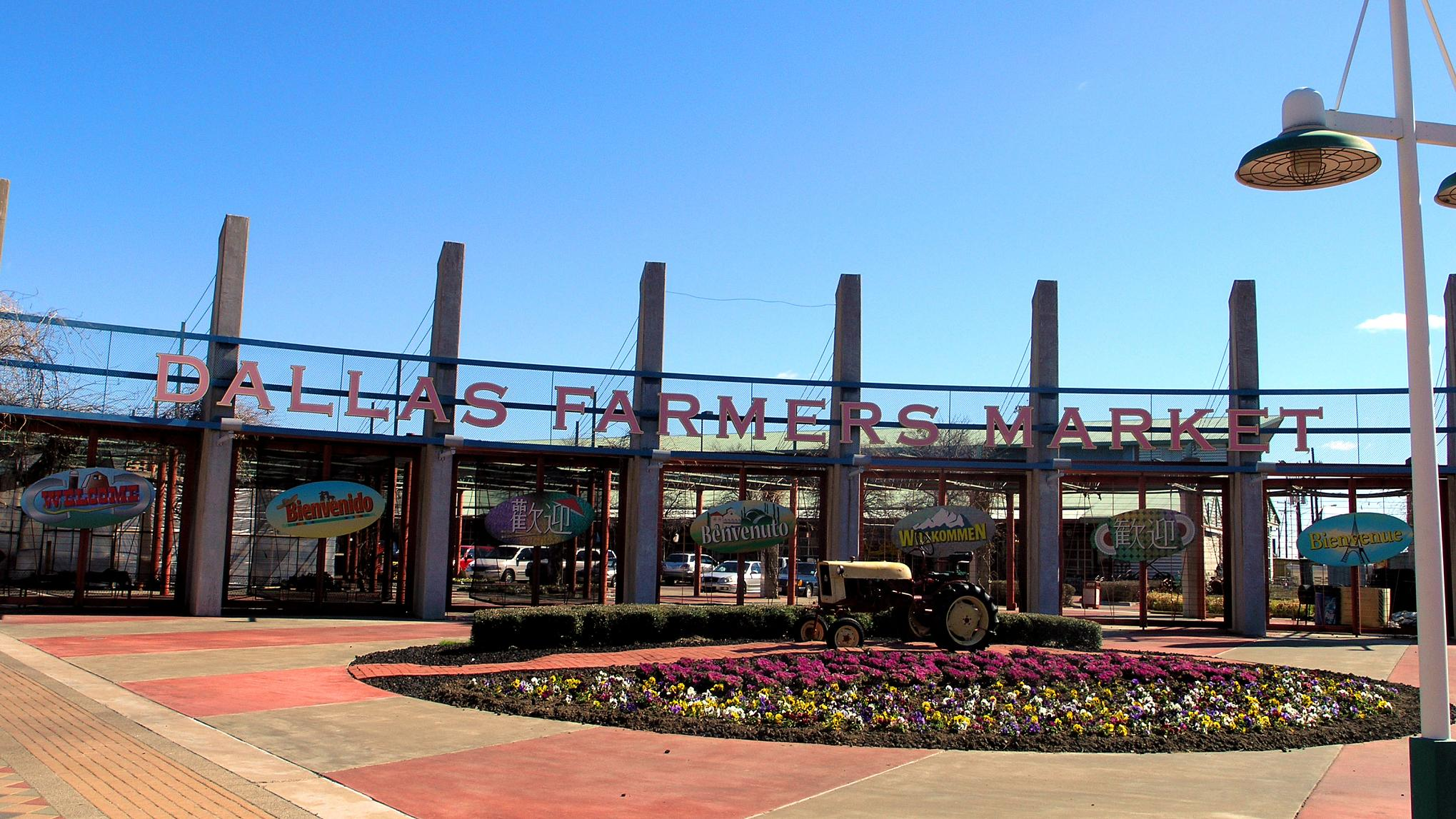
Dallas Farmers Market

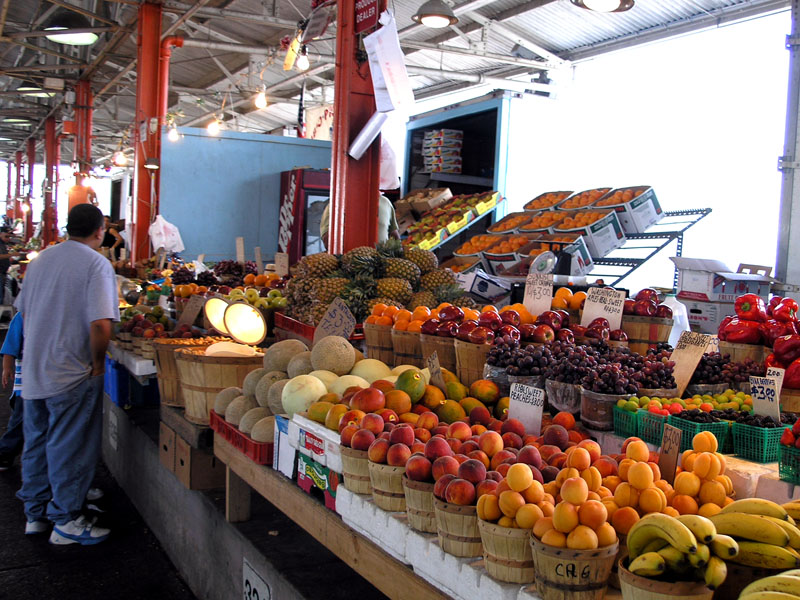
Customers browsing in Shed 2

The Dallas Farmers Market is a large public market located at 1010 S. Pearl Expressway in the Farmers Market District of downtown Dallas, Texas.

The Dallas Farmers Market is one of the oldest and largest farmers markets in Texas. Today, the Dallas Farmers Market features three kinds of sellers: produce dealers, wholesale dealers and local farmers. Also it features a 26,000 square foot indoor food hall and artisanal vendor market. Monthly yard sales, cooking classes, workshops, and seasonal festivals also take place throughout the year. Floral and garden vendors are located adjacent to the market.

== Redevelopment ==
For several years, the Dallas City Council Economic Development Committee has been in talks with developers. In early December 2013, plans were announced for mixed-use residential and retail redevelopment of the area. Announced plans include tearing down Sheds 3 & 4, replacing them with retail space and roughly 300 residential units, and converting Shed 2 entirely to retail and a food pavilion. Shed 1, the only property still owned by the city, will house the remaining actual farmer's market, with an expected doubling of the number of stalls available to local farmers.
