= Earl H. Hulsey =

American businessman (1880–1961)

Earl Henry Hulsey (September 13, 1880 - January 10, 1961) was a Dallas business man and former owner and operator of the Circle Theatre, where Vitaphone made its debut in Texas. The Circle Theatre opened on December 25, 1923.

Hulsey began construction on a building currently known as the Waco Hippodrome Theatre in 1913. Opened on February 7, 1914, the theater was a select road show house and spent much of its life as "Hulsey's Hipp," operated by Hulsey to offer major vaudeville attractions and movies. Hulsey and J.P. Harrison operated the Hippodrome from its opening until 1928. In the mid-1920s, Hulsey sold his downtown Dallas theater interests to Karl Hoblitzelle.

Hulsey was a native of Georgia's DeKalb County and owned several silent motion picture theatres, which he sold when he moved to Dallas to head a brokerage office. He helped form First National Pictures in 1917, and was also a member of the New York Stock Exchange.
