= Omni Dallas Hotel =

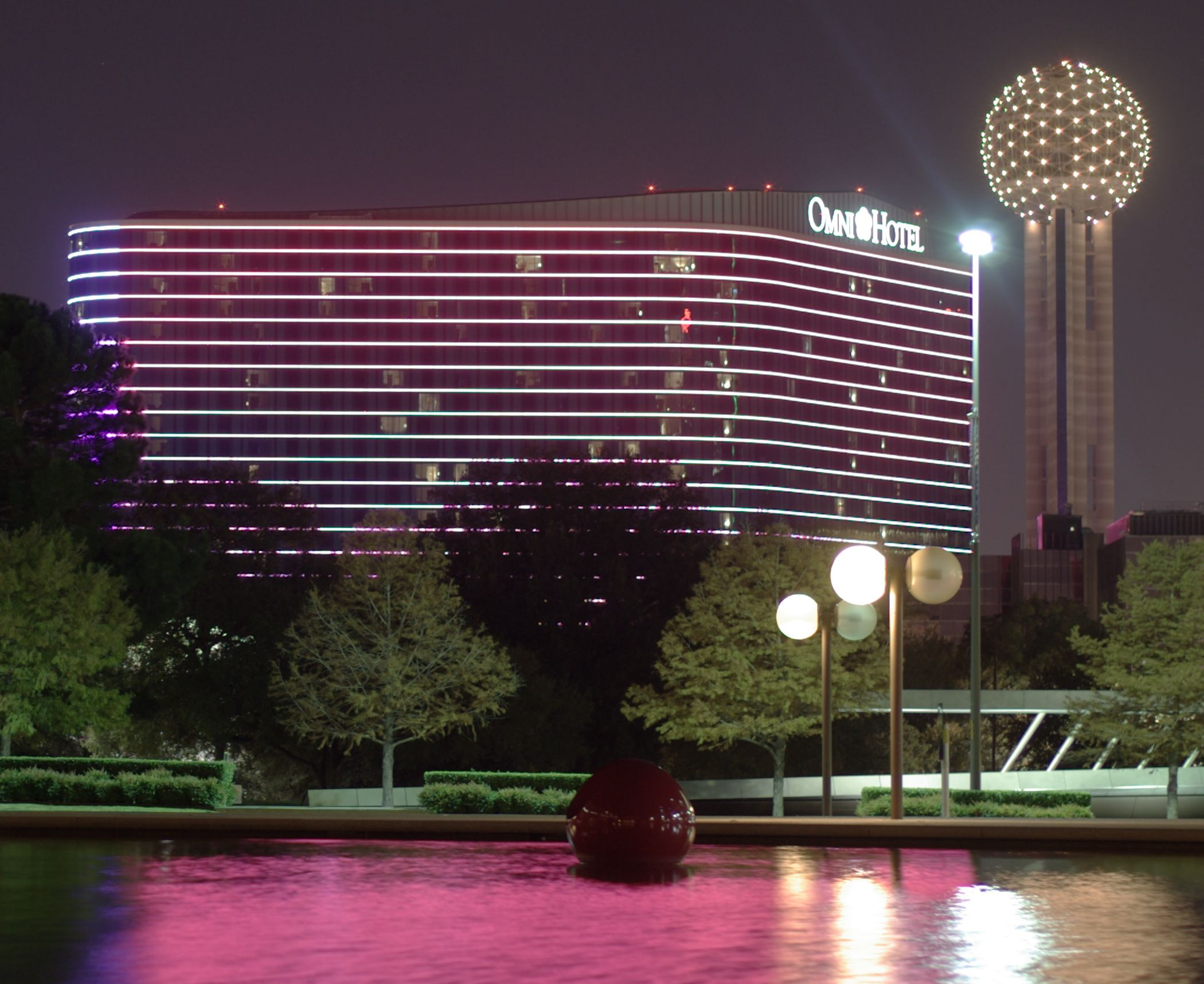

General information
- Status: Completed
- Type: Hotel
- Location: Dallas, Texas, United States
- Coordinates: 32°46′32″N 96°48′15″W
- Opening: November 11, 2011

Height
- Roof: 282 feet (86 m)

Technical details
- Floor count: 23

Design and construction
- Architect: 5G Studio Collaborative with BOKA Powell (architect of record)
- Developer: Matthews Southwest

The Omni Dallas Hotel is a 23-story, 1001-room hotel at the Convention Center District in Dallas, Texas. The $500 million hotel is owned by the City of Dallas, managed by Omni Hotels & Resorts and is attached directly to the Kay Bailey Hutchison Convention Center. VisitDallas is contracted by the City to attract conventions to the Kay Bailey Hutchison Convention Center and increase tourism to fill rooms at the Omni Dallas Hotel although serious doubts about its effectiveness were raised in January 2019 after the release of an audit.

== History ==
The Omni Dallas Hotel was originally announced in February 2009. On June 19, 2009, the Dallas City Council approved an ordinance to authorize the sale of $514 million in Build America Bonds to finance the construction of the hotel, which was built to generate revenue for the adjacent Kay Bailey Hutchison Convention Center. Groundbreaking occurred on September 15, 2009. The building was topped out on October 21, 2010. The hotel formally opened on November 11, 2011.

== Description ==
The building is notable for its LED lighting on the exterior facade. The building is covered in more than 2,200 protective tubes, each of which houses three 3-foot-long LED fixtures. Altogether, the strips measure about 4 miles long. The LEDs are occasionally programmed to display dynamic lighting patterns - from a Jawbreaker maze to advertisements for the Dallas Cowboys. The lights are programmed to run during two intervals, once from sunset to 2 a.m. and again from 5:30 a.m. to sunrise. The colors and lighting are sometimes coordinated with the lighting of the nearby Bank of America Plaza.

The Hotel offers an ideal environment for hosting major events and conferences, providing flexible and multi-purpose meeting spaces spanning over 142,000 square feet.

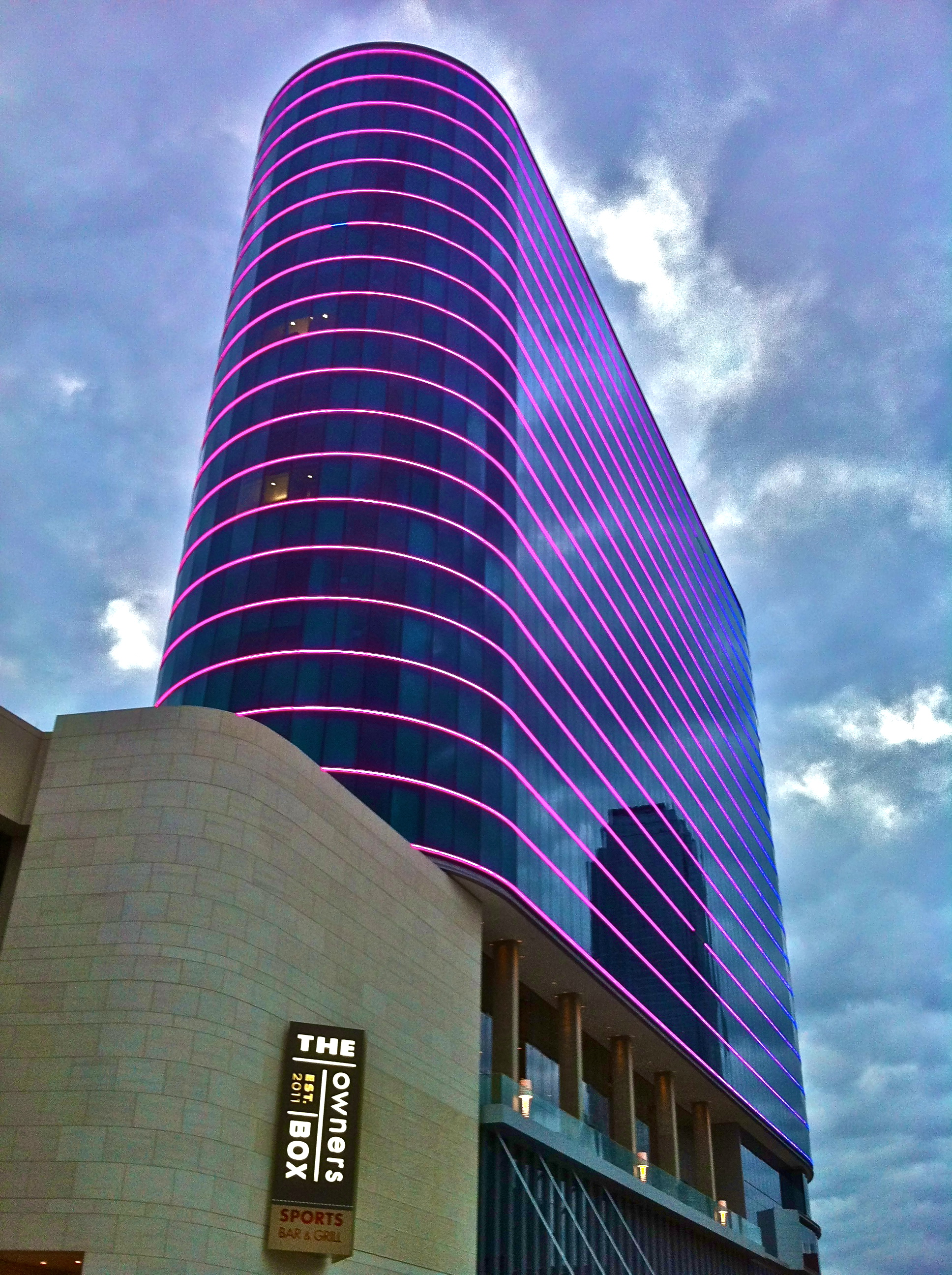
Purple LED lights

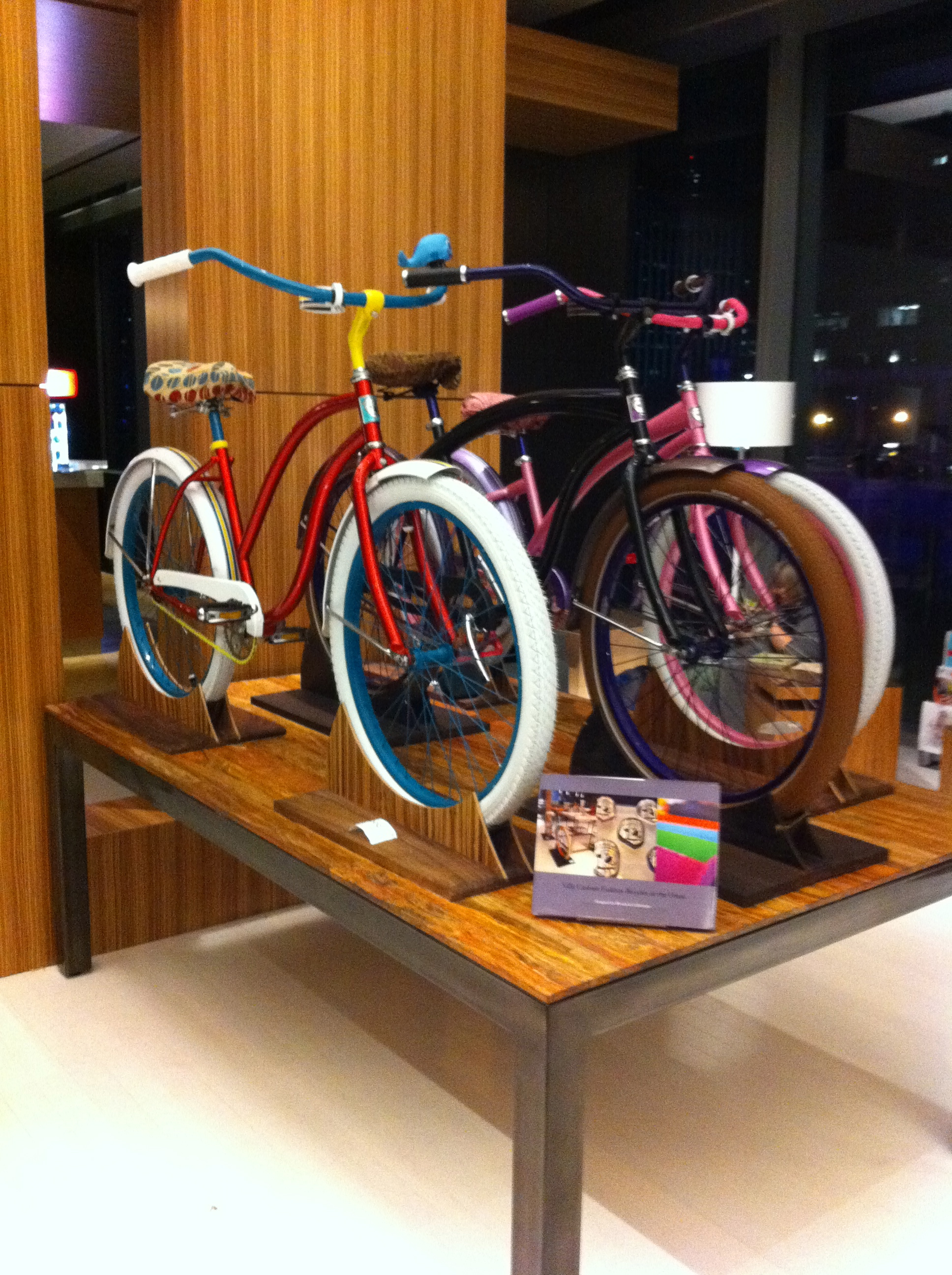
Villy Custom fashion bicycles at the Onmi Dallas gift shop

The hotel features several restaurants and bars along with a gift shop offering products from local artists.
