= Farmers Market District, Dallas =

Neighborhood in Dallas, Texas

Coordinates: 32.7774°N 96.7901°W

Farmers Market District
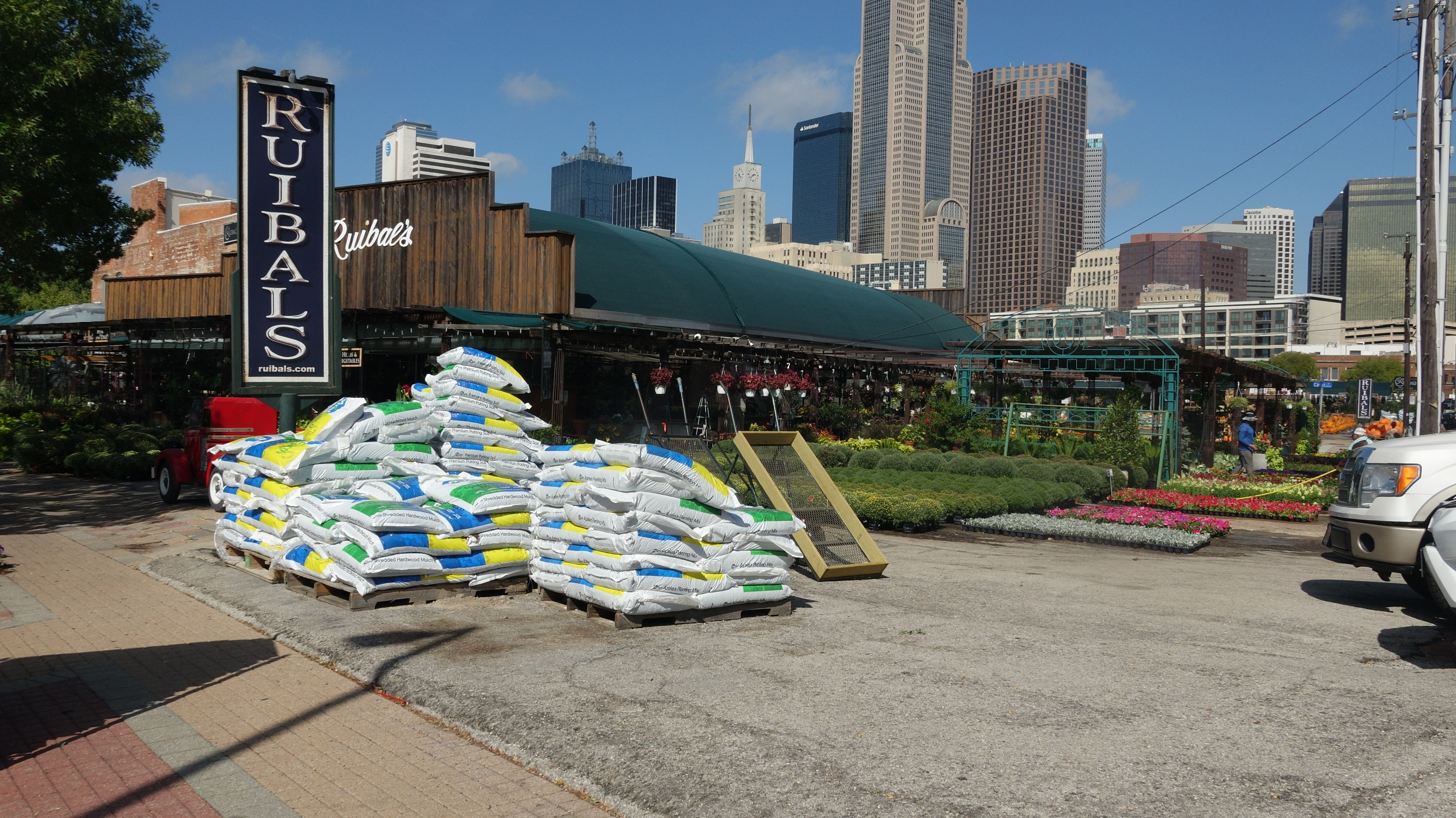

- Location in Dallas
- Country: United States
- State: Texas
- Counties: Dallas
- City: Dallas
- Area: Downtown
- Elevation: 446 ft (136 m)
- ZIP code: 75201
- Area codes: 214, 469, 972

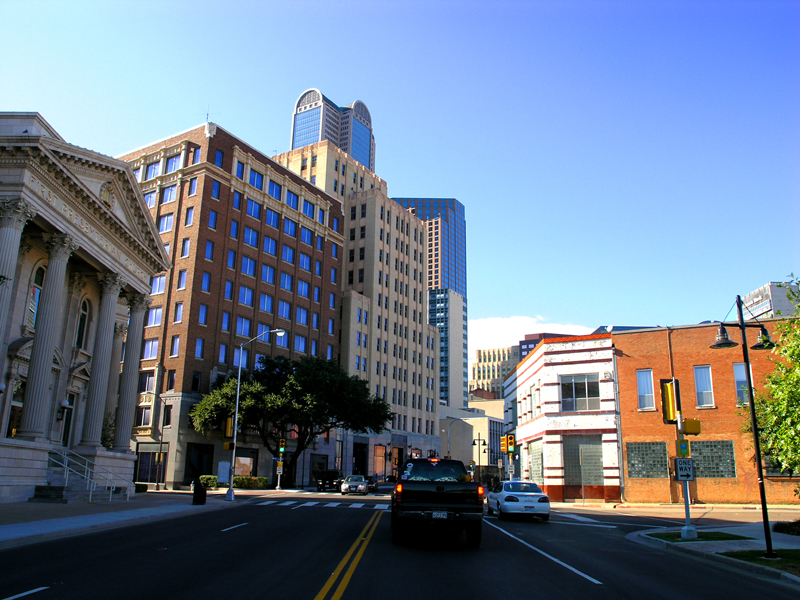
Historic buildings of the Harwood Historic District

The Farmers Market District is an area in southeastern downtown Dallas, Texas (USA). It lies south of the Main Street District, north of the Cedars, west of Deep Ellum, northeast of the Convention Center District, and southeast of the Government District.

== Notable Structures and Parks ==
- Dallas Farmers Market
- Harwood Historic District
- First Presbyterian Church of Dallas
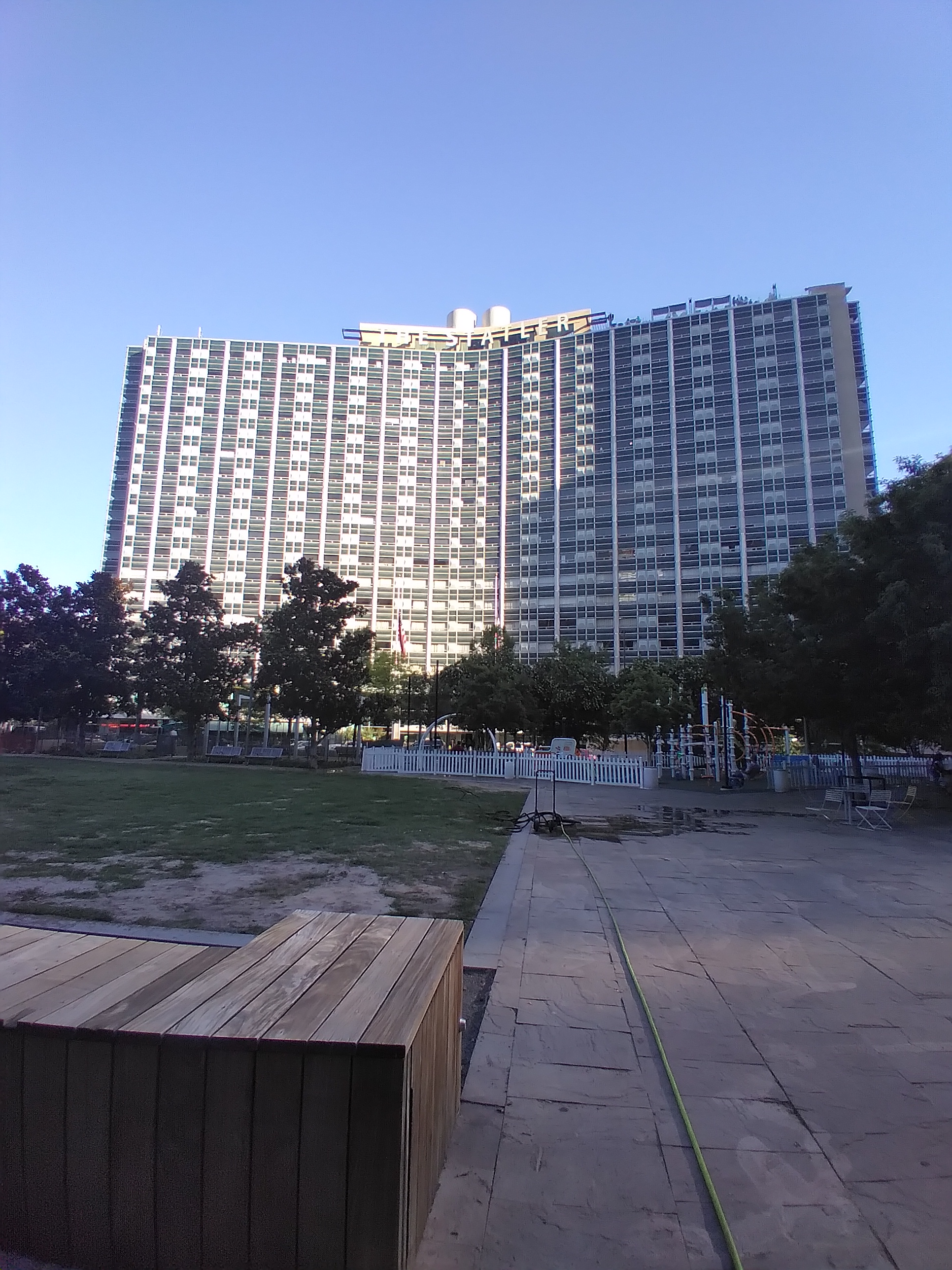
- The Dallas Statler Hilton taken from the Main Street Garden Park.
  Dallas Statler Hilton

== Education ==
The district is zoned to schools in the Dallas Independent School District.

Residents of the district are zoned to City Park Elementary School, Billy Earl Dade Middle School, and James Madison High School.
