= Wong Lo Kat =

Cantonese herbal tea

Wong Lo Kat/Wanglaoji 王老吉
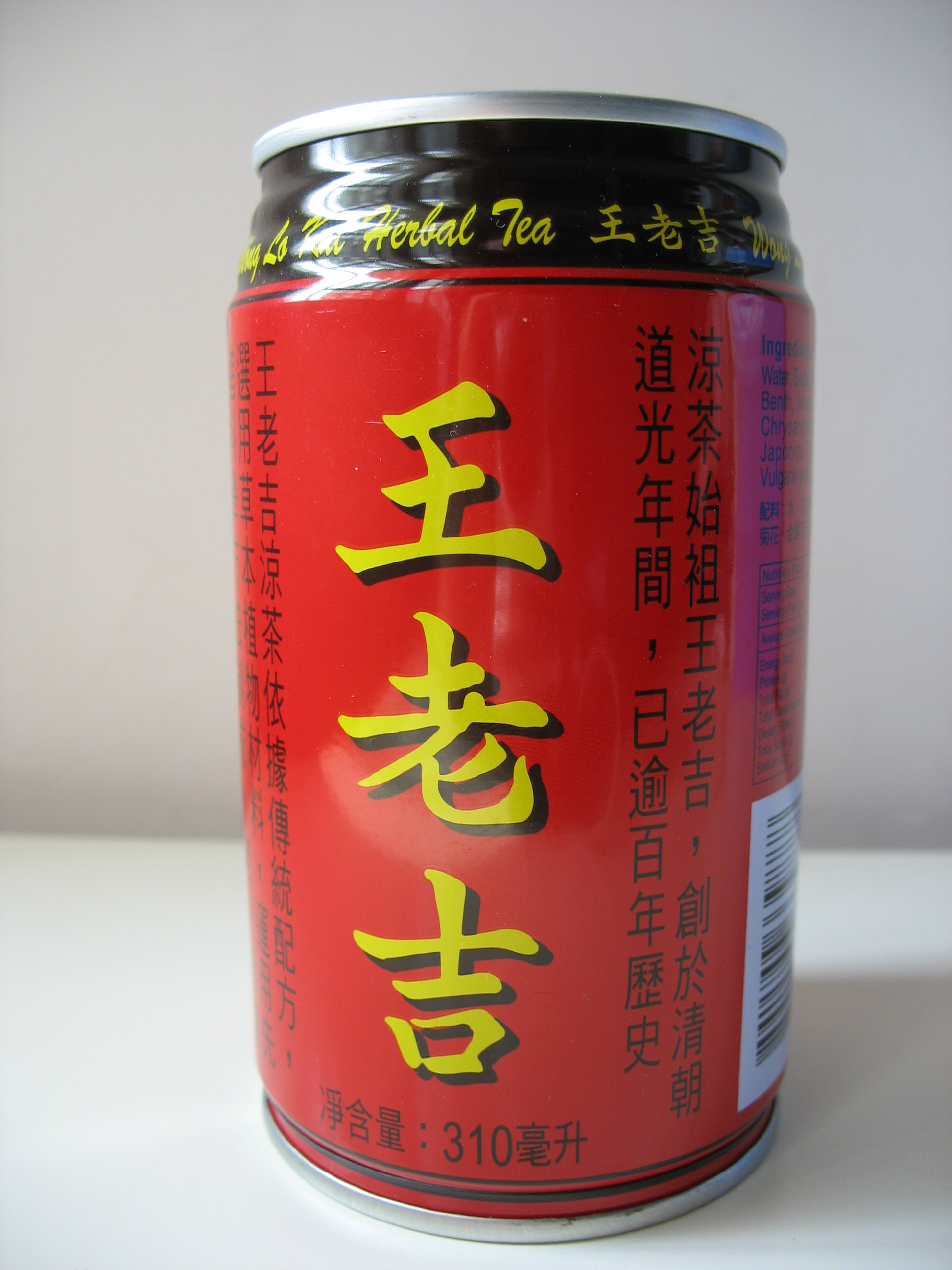
- A can of JDB's Wong Lo Kat
- Type: Herbal tea
- Manufacturer: Various (including JDB Group and Guangzhou Pharmaceutical)
- Origin: China
- Introduced: 1828; 198 years ago

Wong Lo Kat
- Chinese: 王老吉
Transcriptions
Standard Mandarin
- Hanyu Pinyin: Wánglǎojí
Yue: Cantonese
- Yale Romanization: wòhng lóuh gāt
- Jyutping: wong4 lou5 gat1

Wong Lo Kat (Chinese: 王老吉), or Wanglaoji in Mandarin pinyin, is a Chinese herbal tea, and one of the most popular tisane drinks in China today. It is sold in many forms and different types of cans or cardboard containers. It is branded as Walovi in international markets.

== Ingredients ==
Wong Lo Kat contains a number of herbal infusions and decoctions, as well as sweeteners:

- Water
- Sugar
- Mesonas Chinesis
- Plumeria rubra
- Microcos paniculate
- Chrysanthemum
- Lonicera japonica
- Prunella vulgaris
- Licorice

== History ==
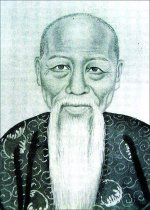
Wong Chat Bong, the founder of Wong Lo Kat

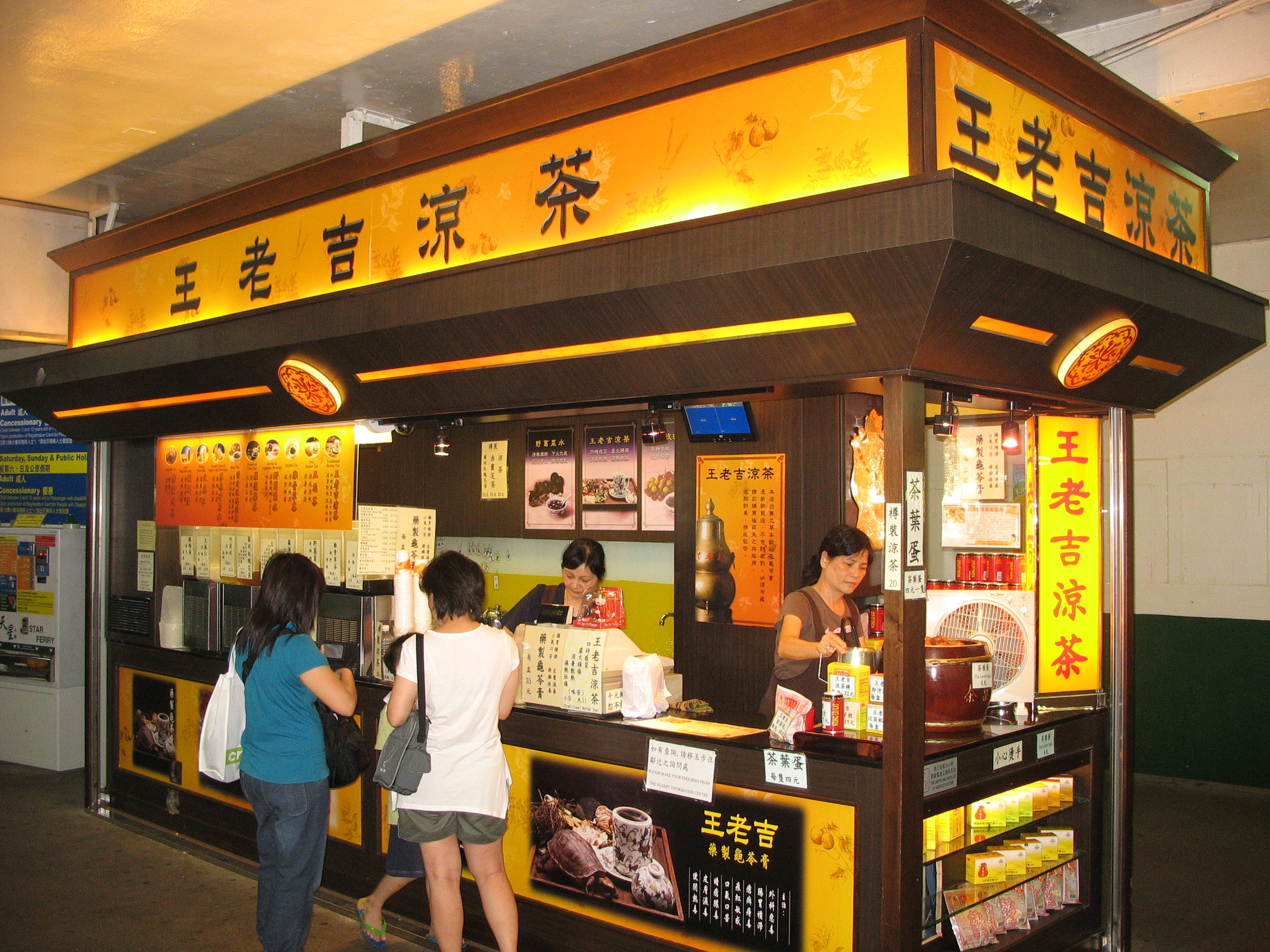
Wong Lo Kat store in Hong Kong

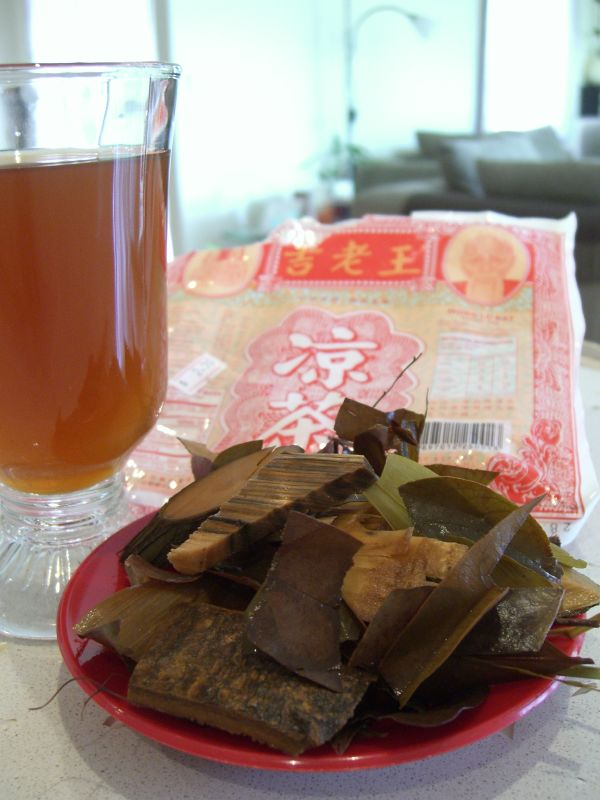
Wong Lo Kat consumed in Taiwan

"Wong Lo Kat" is the Cantonese transliteration of its name in Chinese characters. Wong Lo Kat originated in 1828 during the Qing dynasty in Guangdong (Kwangtung) and Guangxi (Kwangsi) provinces of China, founded by a doctor Wong Chat Bong (simplified Chinese: 王泽邦; traditional Chinese: 王澤邦; pinyin: Wáng Zébāng). Because the Wong family was the inventor of herbal tea brewing in southern China, the brand is synonymous with this type of drink. The recipe has been passed down through multiple generations to today's tea culture.

In around 1949, the Chinese government began seizing private companies and all associated assets. Wong Lo Kat's descendants established operations in Hong Kong, whilst all assets in mainland China passed to a government-owned subsidiary.

=== Trademark dispute in mainland China ===
After the foundation of the People's Republic of China, Wong Lo Kat (pronounced Wánglǎojí in Mandarin) in mainland China has been owned by the government.

"Wanglaoji"'s trademark right holder, Guangzhou Yangcheng Pharmaceutical (广州羊城药业), whose name was later changed to "Guangzhou Wanglaoji Pharmaceutical Co., Ltd." (广州王老吉药业有限公司), a subsidiary of the state-owned Guangzhou Pharmaceutical Holdings Limited (广州医药集团有限公司), licensed the right to use the 王老吉 trade mark to Hong Kong Hung To Group Co., Ltd. (香港鴻道集團有限公司), who marketed the Wong Lo Kat product in red cans, meanwhile the 250 ml green carton version has been produced by Guangzhou Pharmaceutical themselves.

In 1997, Hung To Group and Guangzhou Pharmaceutical signed a trademark license agreement. Hung To Group had legally gained the right to use 王老吉 and its subsidiary JDB Beverage Co., Ltd. (加多宝饮料有限公司) had been the producer of the red can version of Wong Lo Kat in mainland China. JDB Group also used the traditional English name Wong Lo Kat in mainland China, which is 王老吉 in Cantonese spelling since 1828.

The trademark license was renewed in 2000 to make it valid until 2 May 2010. In 2002 and 2003, two additional extensions were signed, extending the validity to 2013 and 2020 respectively.

The sales by JDB increased more rapidly than by Guangzhou Pharmaceutical. The sales of the red can version was at more than 1 billion RMB while the green carton version had annual sales of estimated 80 million RMB in 2004. In 2008, the red can's sales exceeded 10 billion RMB, its annual sales volume in 2007, 2008 and 2009 topped in Chinese beverage can products.

Guangzhou Pharmaceutical Holdings' general manager Li Yiming (李益民) was found guilty of fraud in 2005. As part of the agreements to extend the license, he accepted payment of 3 million HK dollar's from Hung To Group's Chan Hung To (陳鴻道). Hung To Group states that they considered the payment a legitimate fee in relation to the license agreement extension, however, in light of Li Yiming's known fraudulent activity, and as the funds were never received by Guangzhou Pharmaceutical the payment was officially declared a bribe.

In April 2011, Guangzhou Pharmaceutical submitted a "Wanglaoji" trademark issue for arbitration. On 9 May 2012, China International Economic and Trade Arbitration Commission ruled that the two additional trademark contracts were invalid, the valid trademark agreement had expired on 2 May 2010, thus Hung To Group and JDB had no right to use "Wanglaoji" trademark after that date.

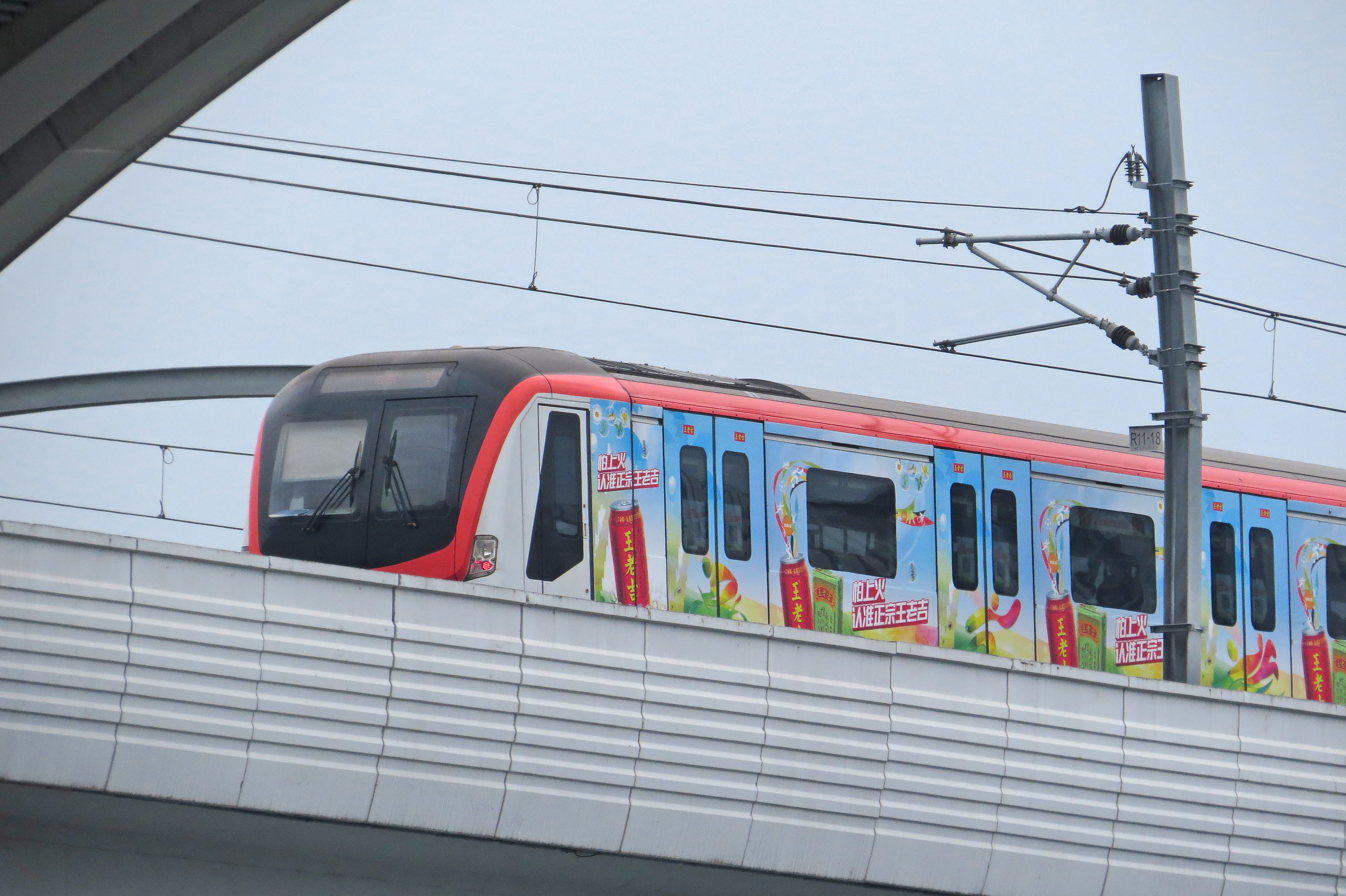
A Shenzhen Metro train wearing the Wong Lo Kat special colours to promote the product

Since 2011, it had been explicitly printed "produced by JDB" on red can products. The product's name has been completely changed to "JDB" (加多寶; aka. Jiāduōbǎo) since May 2012.

Several days after the arbitration, Guangzhou Pharmaceutical started to produce their own red can Wanglaoji beverage.

Wong Chat Bong's descendant in Hong Kong, Wang Jianyi (王健仪), who operated Wong Lo Kat's entity outside the mainland, expressed her support for JDB company.

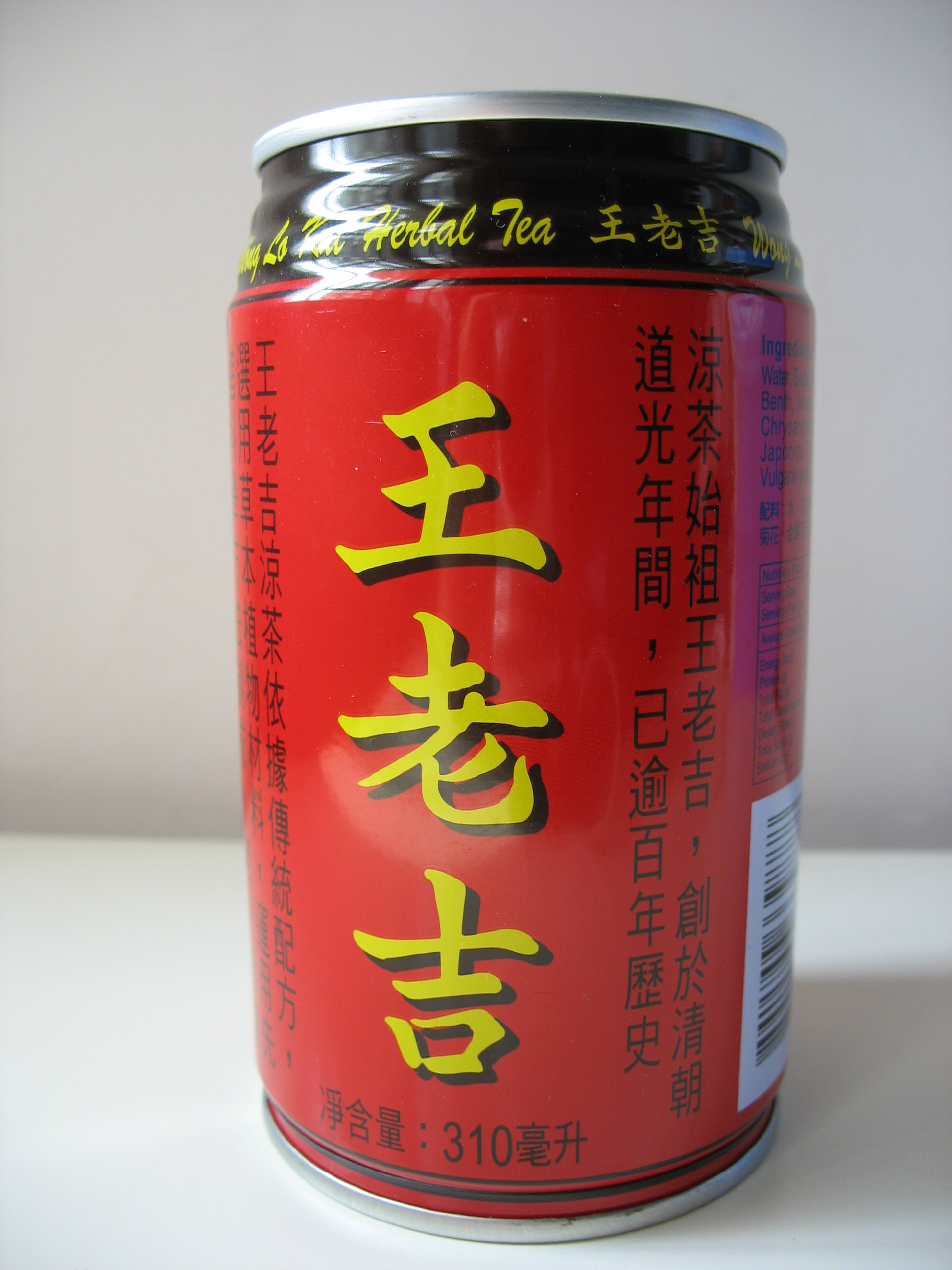
310 ml red can version produced by JDB, named "Wong Lo Kat" (c. 1995–2011)

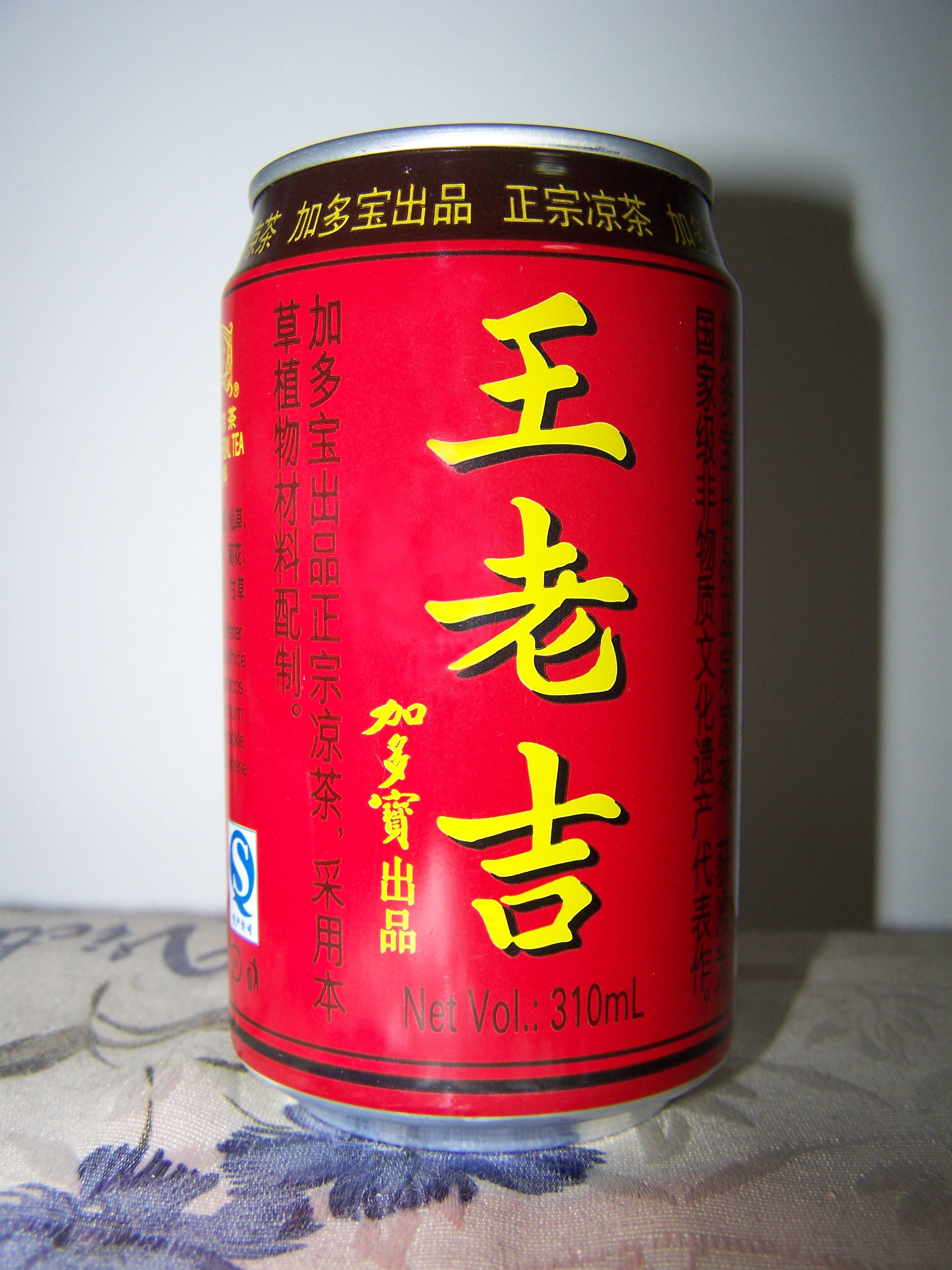
310 ml red can version produced by JDB, named "Wong Lo Kat produced by JDB" (2011 – May 2012)

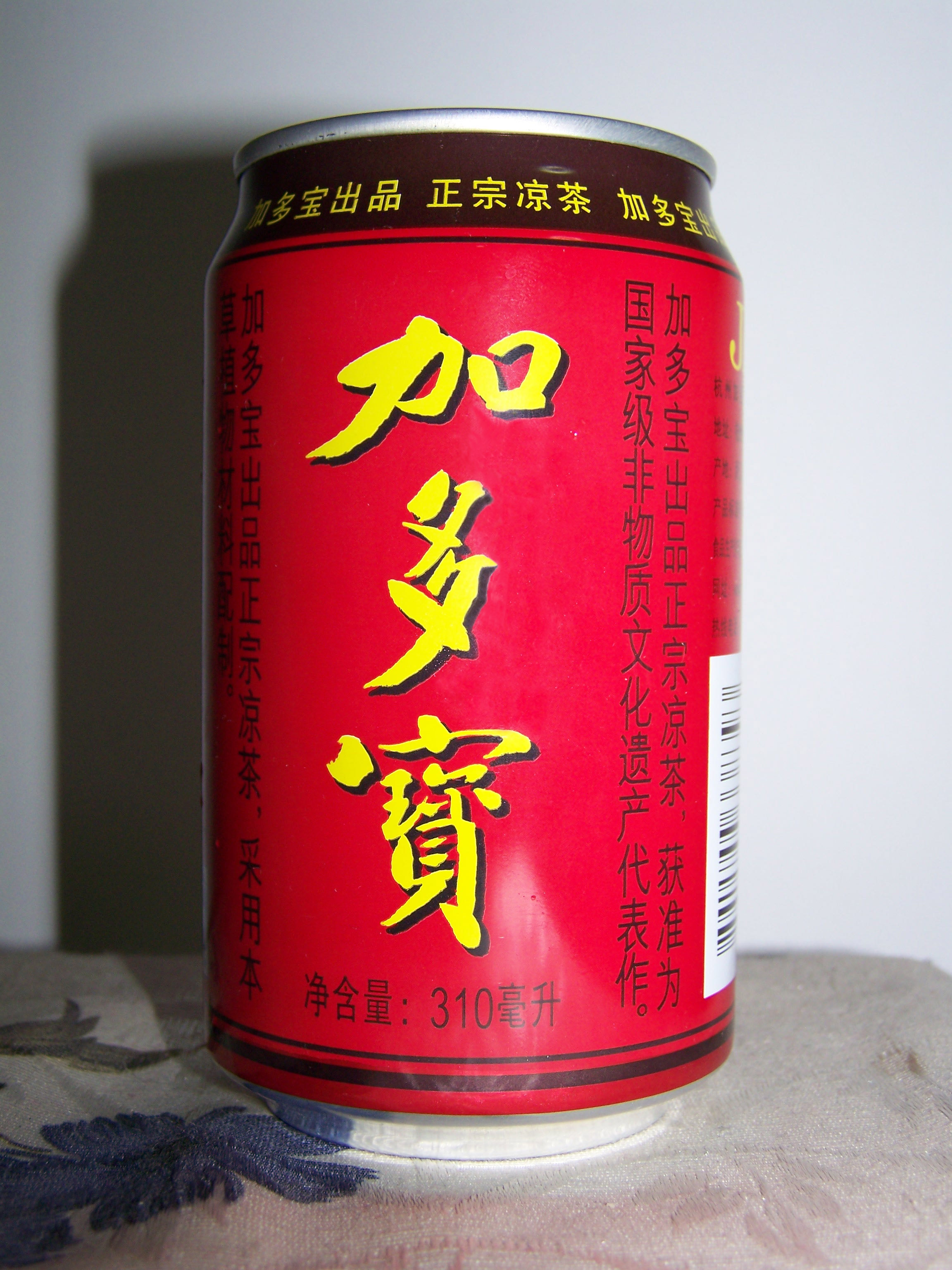
310 ml red can version produced by JDB, named "JDB" (May 2012 – April 2015)

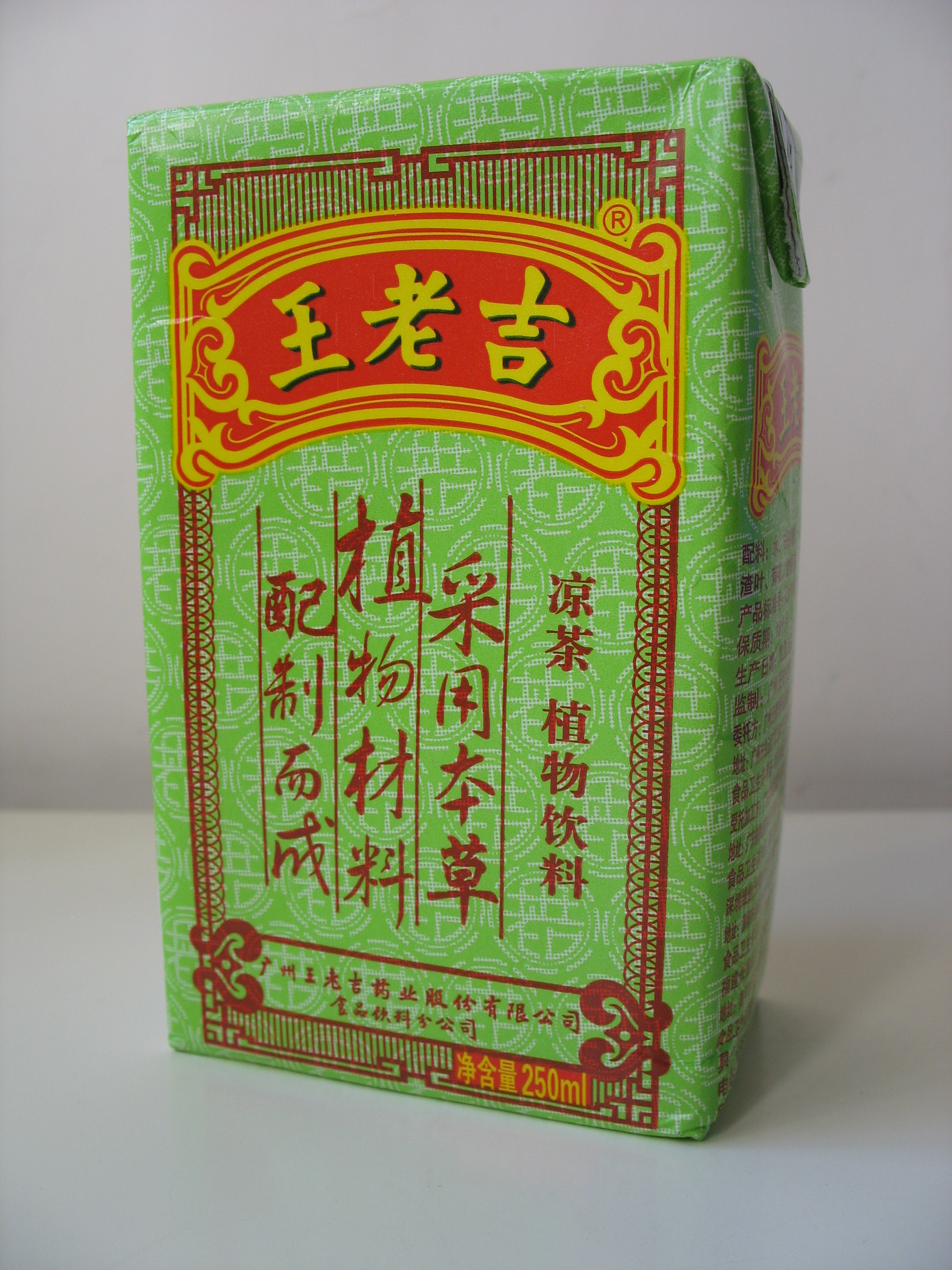
250 ml green carton version produced by Guangzhou Pharmaceutical, named "Wanglaoji" (c. beginning 1995)

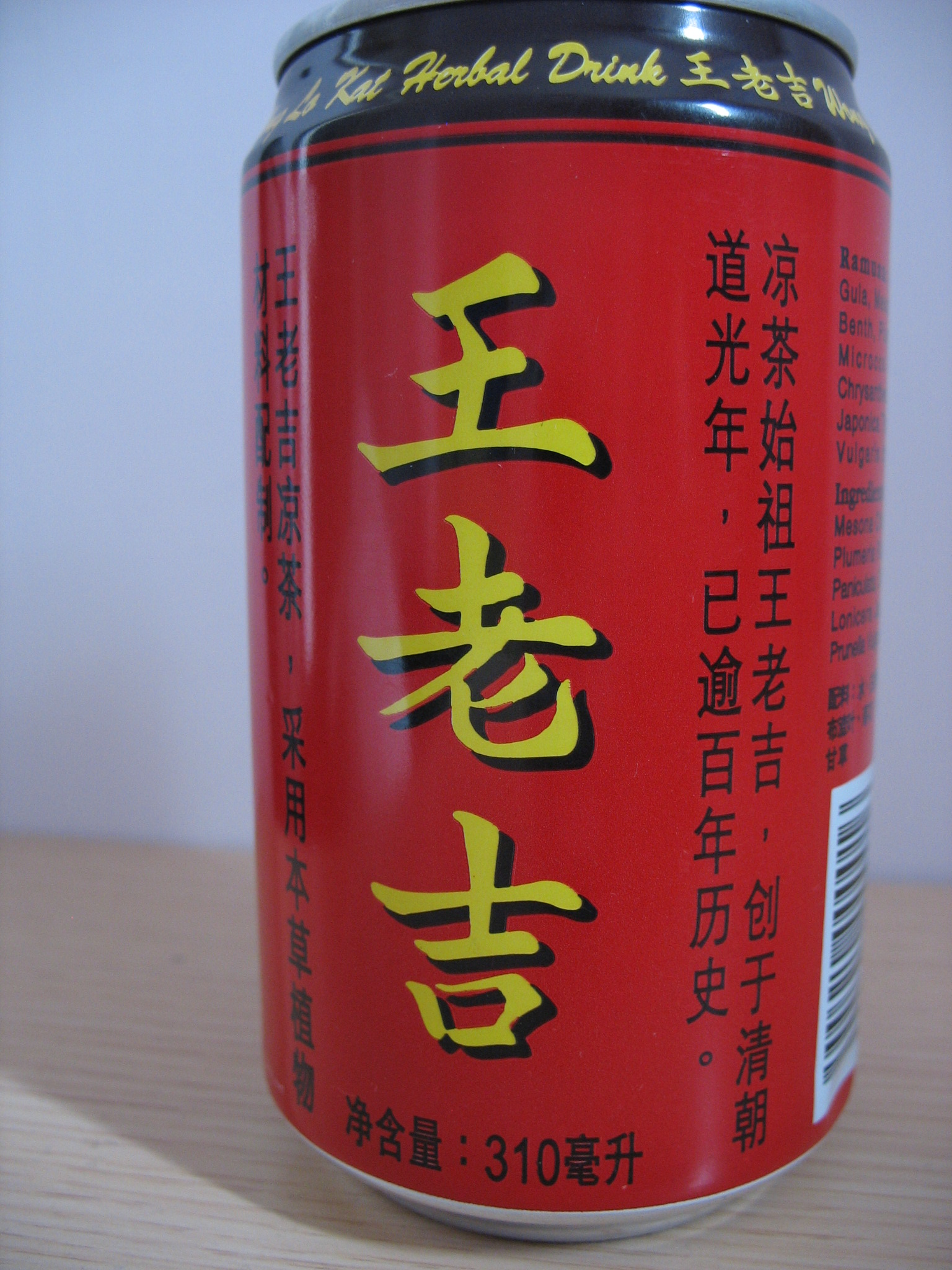
310 ml red can version produced in Malaysia, named "Wong Lo Kat"

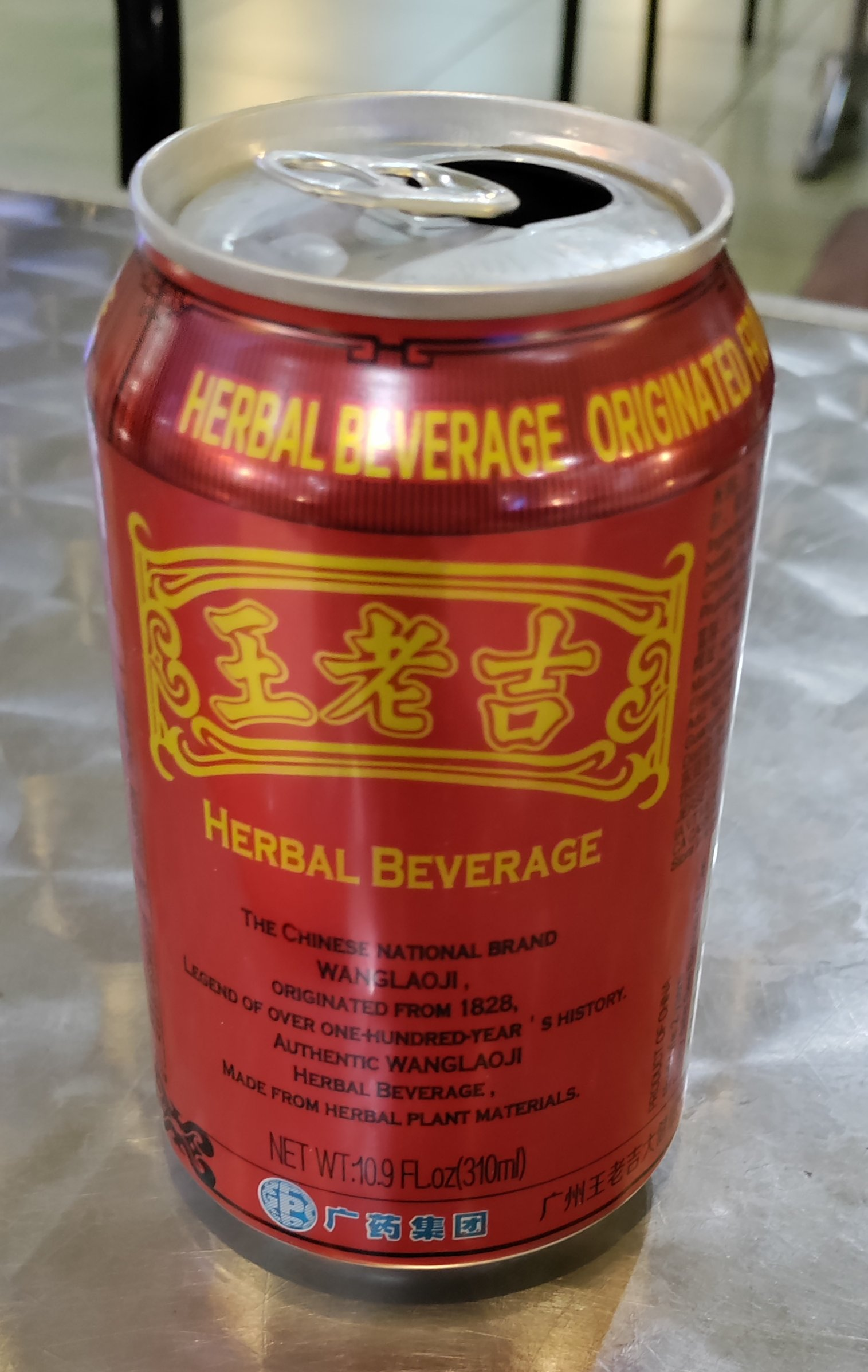
310ml (10.9 fl. oz.) can, as purchased in the United States in 2022
