= Kay Bailey Hutchison Convention Center =

Convention center in Dallas, Texas, US

Coordinates: 32°46′28″N 96°48′05″W

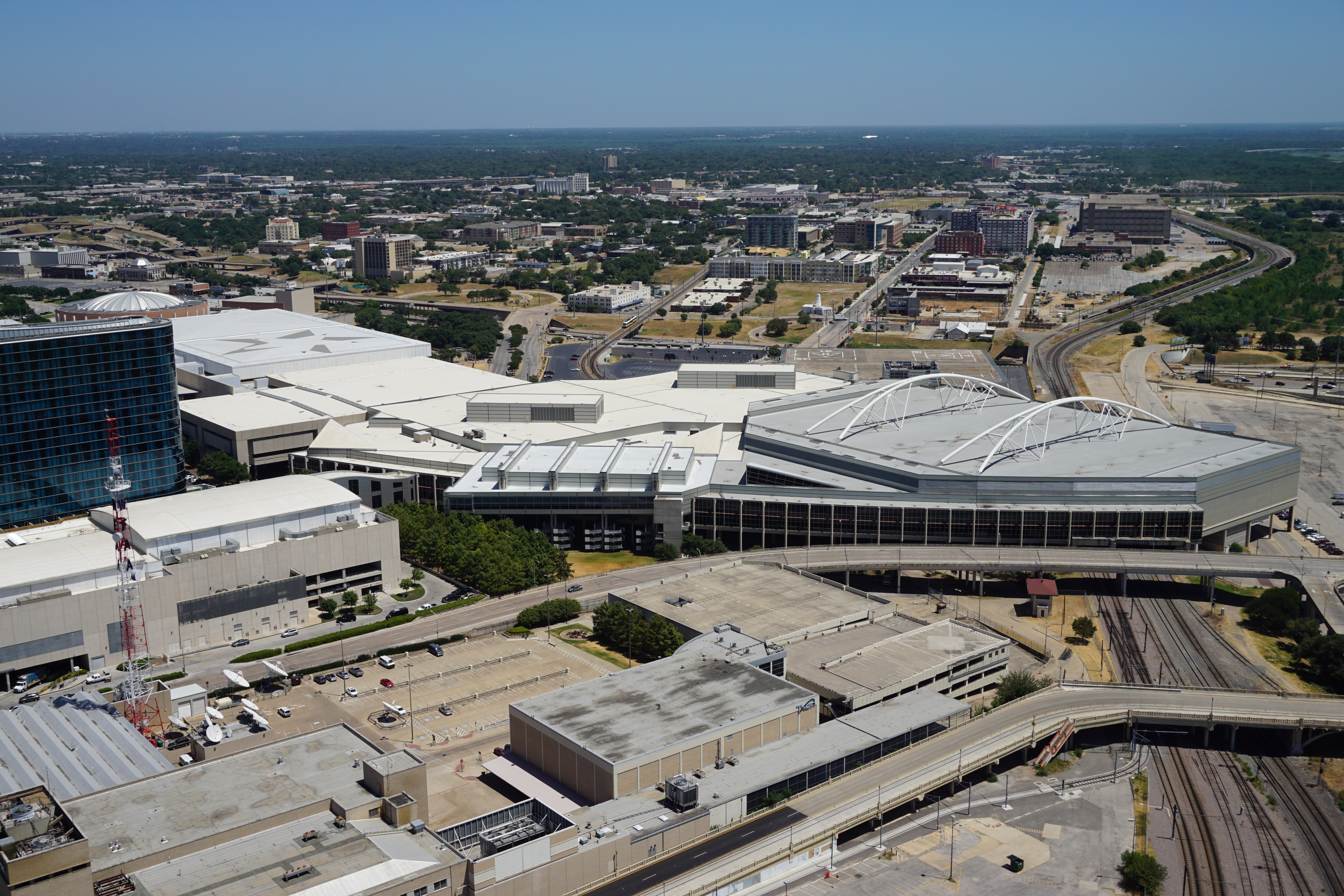
- Aerial view of the complex (c.2015)
- Former names: Dallas Convention Center (1973-2013)
- Address: 650 S Griffin St; Dallas, Texas 75202-5005
- Location: Convention Center District
- Owner: City of Dallas
- Operator: Spectra

Construction
- Built: 1969–73
- Opened: January 1973
- Expanded: 1984; 1994; 2002; 2011
- Architect: Omniplan

Website
- Official Website

The Kay Bailey Hutchison Convention Center (KBHCCD; formerly the Dallas Convention Center) is a convention center in the Convention Center District of downtown Dallas, Texas.

The "Dallas Memorial Auditorium" was a standalone multipurpose arena, designed by George Dahl in 1957. Dahl was responsible for the renowned Art Deco buildings at the Dallas Fair Park, as well as many other Texas landmarks. The Convention Center additions were designed by Larry Oltmanns, who was a Design Partner with Skidmore, Owings and Merrill at the time.

On February 9, 2022, the Dallas City Council voted to take steps toward demolishing the convention center and replacing it with a new one. As of 2026, demolition was ongoing.

== About ==
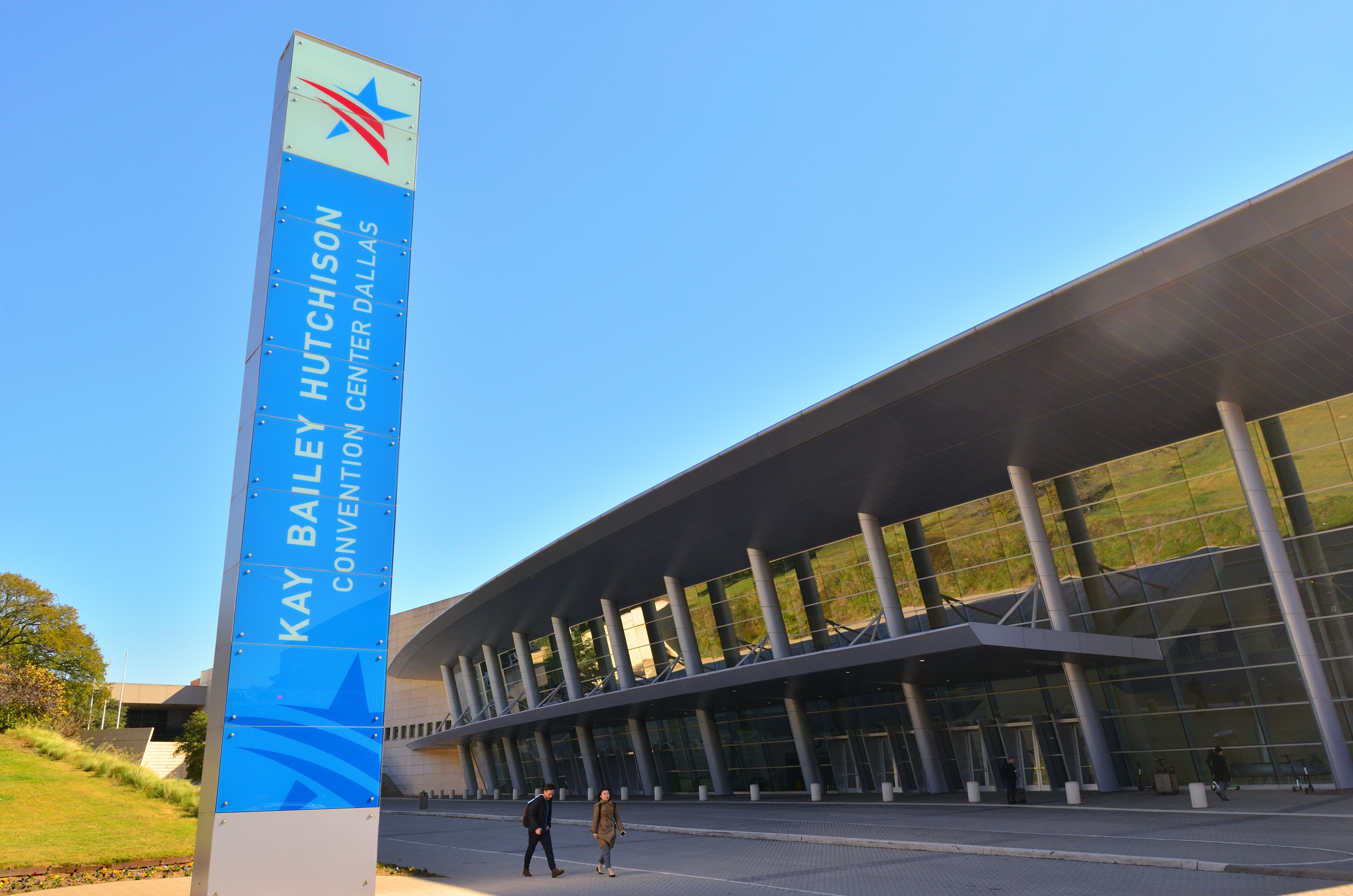
One of the main entrances to the convention center, 2018

The center is over 2,000,000 sq ft (190,000 m^{2}) in size and contains over 1,000,000 sq ft (93,000 m^{2}) of exhibit space. The largest contiguous exhibit space in the structure is 726,726 sq ft (67,515 m^{2}). A 203,000 sq ft (18,900 m^{2}) column-free exhibit hall is the largest of its kind in the United States. It is annually used for the Dallas Auto Show.

The east side of the structure contains the original element of the Dallas Memorial Auditorium, a 9,816-seat arena. The complex also houses a 1,740-seat theater, 105 meeting rooms, and two gigantic ballrooms.

In May 2009, voters approved the construction of the Omni Dallas Convention Center Hotel, a 1,000 room hotel that is attached to the Convention Center. It opened in late 2011, under budget and ahead of schedule.

== History ==
The Dallas Memorial Auditorium was originally constructed in 1957 near the intersection of Canton and Akard Streets. While the auditorium still hosts many smaller events, its antiquated facilities and technology, along with the fact that it is not compliant with the Americans with Disabilities Act, have kept it less busy than in the past.

In 1973, the center was expanded and renamed the Dallas Convention Center; the expansion was designed by local architects Omniplan. The center was expanded again in 1984 and once more in 1994, when Dallas Area Rapid Transit constructed the Convention Center Station underneath the west-wing of the facility, connecting it to the Red and Blue light rail lines. The most-recent addition to the facility was completed in 2002. This renovation included the creation of the largest column-free expansion space in the world at the time. A steel space frame roof was suspended from twin parabolic arches 400 ft. across and 50 ft. tall with roof trusses designed as simple for dead loads but continuous for live loads. The complex was renamed in honor of former US Senator Kay Bailey Hutchison in 2013.

=== Notable tenants and events ===
The venue was once home of the Dallas Chaparrals/Texas Chaparrals of the American Basketball Association, who played in Dallas from the 1967–68 season through the 1972–73 season. The team moved to San Antonio in 1973 and became the San Antonio Spurs.

On September 18, 1964, The Beatles performed their only concert in Dallas at Dallas Memorial Auditorium. A bomb threat delayed the show temporarily, although no bomb was found. On August 22, 1973, The Jackson 5 held a concert in the auditorium. While on a five city tour in the final week of 1976, Elvis Presley performed at the Dallas Convention Center on December 28. The concert was recorded and later released on the Follow That Dream collectors label with the title of Showtime! On April 1, 1977, Led Zeppelin opened what would become their last American tour together in the Dallas Memorial Auditorium, their sixth time performing at the venue. In October 1978, Queen played at the Convention Center during their US tour, and the music video for "Fat Bottomed Girls" was filmed at the center. Prince had two concerts at the venue: once in 1981 and again in 2000. Other performers who held concerts here include: Madonna, James Brown, The Beatles, The Rolling Stones, The Who, Jimi Hendrix, The Doors, Grateful Dead, Black Sabbath, Bruce Springsteen, David Bowie, Billy Joel, Kansas, Thin Lizzy, and Elvis Costello.

The Dallas Convention Center was the site of the 1984 Republican National Convention. President Ronald Reagan accepted the nomination for a second term there on Aug. 23, 1984.

Together with Reunion Arena, the Center was an emergency shelter for thousands of Hurricane Katrina refugees in September 2005. The Center was used again during Hurricane Harvey in 2017.

Beginning in 2014, the Center became the venue for Fan Expo Dallas.

From March 31 to April 3, 2016, WWE hosted the WrestleMania Axxess Convention at the Center, as part of the lead-up to WrestleMania 32 at AT&T Stadium in Arlington. As part of the event, it also hosted NXT TakeOver: Dallas on April 1.

On August 17, 2019, Y. S. Jaganmohan Reddy, the Chief Minister of Andhra Pradesh, addressed Non-resident Indians.

From April 2021 to May 2025, the annual VEX Robotics Competition World Championships were held at the Center. The VEX Robotics World Championship had previously been hosted at the Center in 2009 and 2010.

The Kay Bailey Hutchison Convention Center also served as the International Broadcast Center during the 2026 FIFA World Cup.

The Dallas Wings of the Women's National Basketball Association are expected to play at the auditorium starting from the 2028 WNBA season after renovations are complete.

== Transportation and access ==
The convention center offers a parking garage and three surface parking lots (Lots C and E). In addition to the Red and Blue line service at the eponymous Convention Center station, additional rail transportation (including Amtrak and the Trinity Railway Express) is available at the Dallas Union Station to the northeast of the Convention Center.

One of the world's largest heliport/vertiport facilities sits atop the structure and 75 truck berths line its docks. The Dallas CBD Vertiport, located at the south end of the complex, has two 60 ft × 60 ft (18 m × 18 m) concrete final approach and takeoff areas (FATOs) and 169,000 sq ft (15,700 m^{2}) of flight deck, and is capable of handling both helicopters and tiltrotor aircraft.
