= Convention Center District, Dallas =

Neighborhood in Dallas, Texas

Coordinates: 32.774°N 96.803°W

Convention Center District
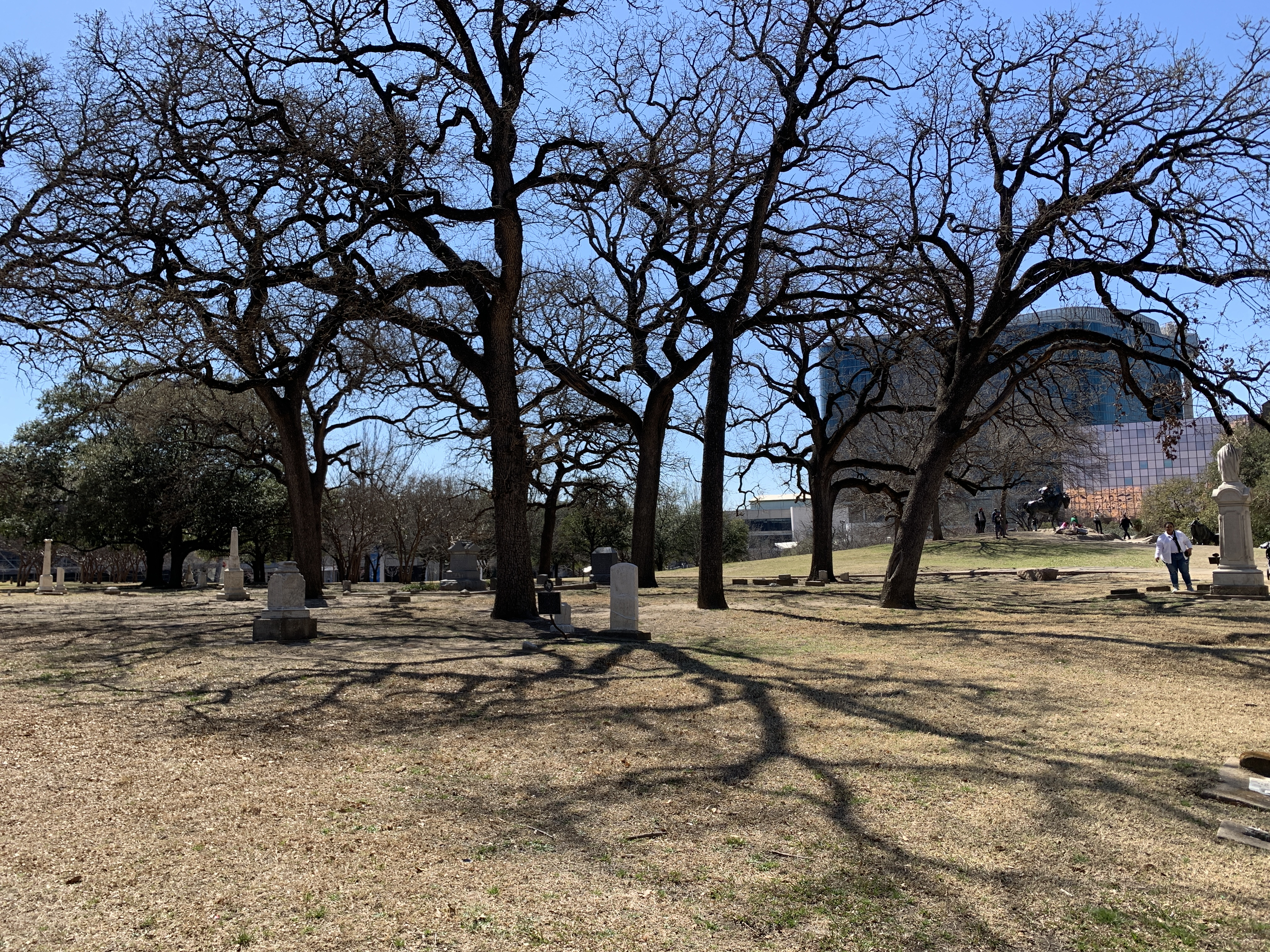

- Location in Dallas
- Country: United States
- State: Texas
- Counties: Dallas
- City: Dallas
- Area: Downtown
- Elevation: 410 ft (120 m)
- ZIP code: 75202
- Area codes: 214, 469, 972

The Convention Center District is an area in southern downtown Dallas, Texas (USA). It lies south of the Government District, north of the Cedars, west of the Farmers Market District, and east of the Reunion District. Visitdallas is contracted by the city to attract conventions, although an audit released in January 2019 cast doubts on its effectiveness.

== Attractions ==
- Dallas Convention Center
- Pioneer Plaza
- Pioneer Park Cemetery

== Transportation ==
=== Highways ===
- - Interstate 30
- - Interstate 35E

=== Trains ===
- DART: Blue Line and Red Line
- Convention Center Station

=== Air ===
- Dallas CBD Vertiport
Districts of downtown Dallas

== Education ==
The district is zoned to schools in the Dallas Independent School District.

Residents of the district are zoned to City Park Elementary School, Billy Earl Dade Middle School, and James Madison High School.
