= JDB Group =

Chinese beverage company

- Type: Private
- Industry: Beverage
- Founded: 1995
- Founder: Chan Hung-to
- Headquarters: Dongguan City, China
- Area served: China
- Key people: Chan Hung-to (Chairman & CEO)
- Products: Wong Lo Kat, JDB Red Can
- Subsidiaries: Guangdong JDB Beverage Company Limited; JDB Beverage Company Limited; Zhejiang JDB Beverage Company Limited; Fujian JDB Beverage Company Limited
- Website: jdbchina.com

JDB Group is a Chinese manufacturer of nonalcoholic beverages, headquartered in Dongguan, Guangdong province in the People's Republic of China. Its herbal tea products are among the most popular beverages in China, competing with brands like Pepsi and Coca-Cola in Chinese market. It has been dubbed "China's Coca-Cola" because of its huge success in its home market.

On December 26, 2024, video game company miHoYo announced a collaboration with JDB Group to release special-edition beverage cans featuring Aventurine and Tingyun in time for New Year, with the aim of helping players "receive good fortune and wealth" in the upcoming year. Figures with stands and other special-edition merchandise was also released.
