= Dallas CBD Vertiport =

Municipal heliport in Dallas, Texas, United States

- IATA: JDB; ICAO: none; FAA LID: 49T

Summary
- Airport type: Public
- Owner: City of Dallas
- Serves: Dallas, Texas
- Location: 801 S. Lamar Street, Dallas, Texas
- Elevation AMSL: 480 ft (150 m)
- Coordinates: 32°46′24″N 096°48′01″W

Map
- Location within Texas

Helipads
Number	Length		Surface
Number	ft	m	Surface
H1	60	18	Concrete
H2	60	18	Concrete

Statistics (2015)
- Aircraft operations: 780
- Based aircraft: 0
- Source: Federal Aviation Administration unless noted otherwise

Dallas CBD Vertiport (IATA: JDB, FAA LID: 49T) is a city-owned public heliport/vertiport in the city of Dallas, Dallas County, Texas, United States. The facility is located at the south end of the Kay Bailey Hutchison Convention Center in the Dallas Central Business District, and is claimed to be the world's largest elevated heliport/vertiport.

Most U.S. airports use the same three-letter location identifier for the FAA and IATA, but Dallas CBD Vertiport is assigned 49T by the FAA and JDB by the IATA.

The facility is used solely for general aviation purposes, which can include air taxi operations.

The 2022 Kay Bailey Hutchison Convention Center Dallas Master Plan investigated the future location and configuration of the vertiport. On July 24, 2025, the facility closed for construction. The vertiport is being redesigned and updated alongside construction of the new convention center. The facility is scheduled to reopen in mid-2029.

== Facilities ==
Dallas CBD Vertiport has two FATO/TLOFs:

- H1: 60 x 60 ft. (18 x 18 m), approach/departure orientation: 04, surface: concrete
- H2: 60 x 60 ft. (18 x 18 m), approach/departure orientation: 31, surface: concrete

The airside features, on an approximately 169,000-square-foot wide elevated deck, five 60 ft. x 60 ft. squared helicopter stands. According to the Dallas Executive Airport website, three helicopters plus two vertical-take-off and landing aircraft can be accommodated at the same time. Large helicopters, tilt-rotor aircraft such as the V-22 Osprey, and other VTOL aircraft up to 43,000 lbs can operate from the vertiport. The facility has also a dedicated automobile parking lot, and a lobby with a conference room and a pilots waiting area.

In the year ending December 31, 2015, the heliport had 780 aircraft operations, an average of 2 per day: 100% general aviation.

== See also ==
- List of airports in Texas
