= Downtown Dallas =

Central business district in United States

Dallas Central Business District
- Central business district and residential area
- Downtown Dallas
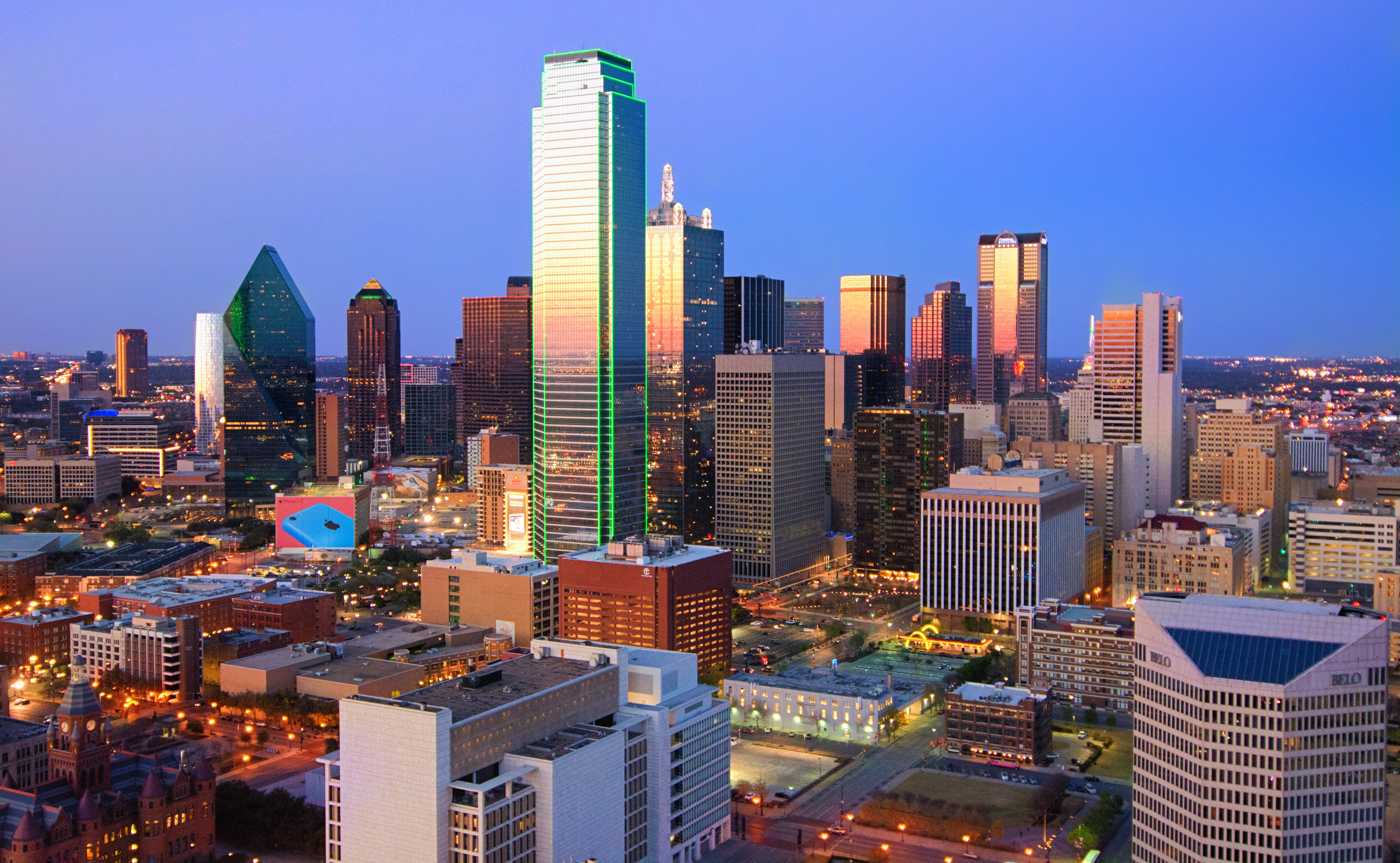
- Skyline of Downtown Dallas seen from Reunion Tower
- Nickname: Big "D"
- Location in Dallas
- Country: United States
- State: Texas
- County: Dallas
- City: Dallas

Area
  - Total: 1.40 sq mi (3.63 km^{2})
  - Land: 1.40 sq mi (3.63 km^{2})
  - Water: 0 sq mi (0 km^{2}) 0%
- Elevation: 440 ft (130 m)

Population (2017)
  - Total: 10,766
  - Density: 7,680/sq mi (2,966/km^{2})
- ZIP code: 75201, 75202, 75270
- Area codes: 214, 469, 972
- Website: www.downtowndallas.com

Downtown Dallas is the central business district (CBD) of Dallas, Texas, United States, located in the geographic center of the city. It is the second-largest business district in the state of Texas. The area termed "Downtown" has traditionally been defined as bounded by the downtown freeway loop, bounded on the east by I-345 (although known and signed as the northern terminus of I-45 and the southern terminus of US 75 (Central Expressway), on the west by I-35E, on the south by I-30, and on the north by Woodall Rodgers Freeway.

The strong organic growth of Downtown Dallas since the early 2000s and continuing into the present has now resulted in Downtown Dallas, Inc.'s expansion of the term "Downtown" to include the explosive growth occurring immediately north of the Woodall Rodgers Freeway in the Victory Park and Uptown/Turtle Creek Districts, as well as past Central Expressway to the east in the Deep Ellum and Bryan Place Districts, past Interstate 30 to the south with the Cedars District, and jumping over Interstate 35E to the west to include the Design District and Lower Oak Lawn. In total, 15 districts now form "Downtown".

Downtown Dallas is now viewed as an interconnected grouping of dense and urban center city districts, that while unique in their own right, also share strong urban linkages to each other and collectively participate in their role as Downtown Dallas.

== History ==
In 1910, Downtown Dallas was the location of a lynching of a black American man accused of raping a two-and-a-half-year-old white girl. A mob pulled him out of the Dallas County Courthouse and hanged him from a telephone pole.

On November 22, 1963, the assassination of John F. Kennedy occurred here. Both President Kennedy and Texas governor John Connally (who survived) were shot as their motorcade passed through Dealey Plaza in what is now the West End Historic District. Part of the former Texas School Book Depository is now the Sixth Floor Museum, with exhibits about Kennedy and the assassination. Nearby is the John Fitzgerald Kennedy Memorial.

The building boom of the 1970s and 1980s produced a distinctive contemporary profile for the downtown skyline influenced by nationally prominent architects. At the same time, the establishment of the West End Historic District in the 1980s preserved a very large group of late 19th-century brick warehouses that have been adapted for use as restaurants and shops.

With the construction of the Dallas Center for the Performing Arts in the Arts District of Downtown, Dallas will be the only city in the world that has four buildings within one contiguous block designed by four separate and distinguished Pritzker Architecture Prize winners.

Downtown Dallas has also gained more recent national attention for the 2016 shooting of police officers and the 2019 courthouse shooting.

In July 2024, a historic church in Downtown Dallas, First Baptist Dallas Church, caught on fire. There were no injuries during this fire.

=== Expansion ===
The area has been undergoing a transition as dozens of residential conversions and new high-rise condominiums bringing more permanent residents to the downtown area. (See: North Central Texas Council of Governments (NCTCOG).) As of 2017, an estimated 10,766 residents lived within the area. Its redeveloped Main Street has recently become more of a place for Dallasites to play after several restaurants, hotels, and residential towers opened their doors along the strip. Downtown's growth can partially be attributed to Dallas Area Rapid Transit's four light rail lines and one commuter line Trinity Railway Express that run through Downtown and an aggressive stance taken by the city to drive development at all costs. The city has invested $160 million of public funds in Downtown Dallas for residential development that attracted $650 million of private investment.

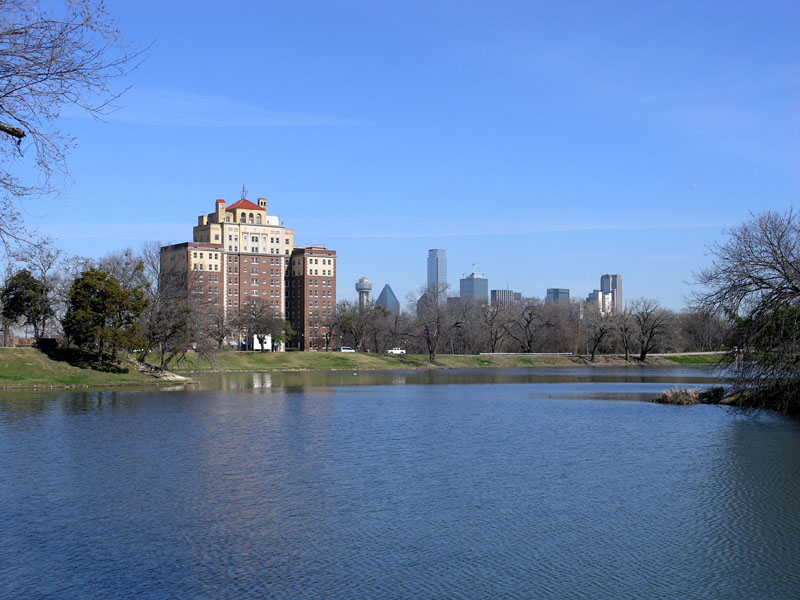
Downtown Dallas as seen from Lake Cliff in Oak Cliff

Two of the first new-construction office building projects downtown in over 20 years broke ground in 2005: One Arts Plaza, a 24-story mixed-use office, retail, residential development in the Arts District, which houses 7-Eleven's world headquarters; and the 17-story Hunt Consolidated office building, with LED exterior lighting, which is the national headquarters for Hunt Oil and is fully occupied by the company. The $200 million, 42-story Museum Tower residential skyscraper in the Downtown Dallas Arts District was completed in 2013.

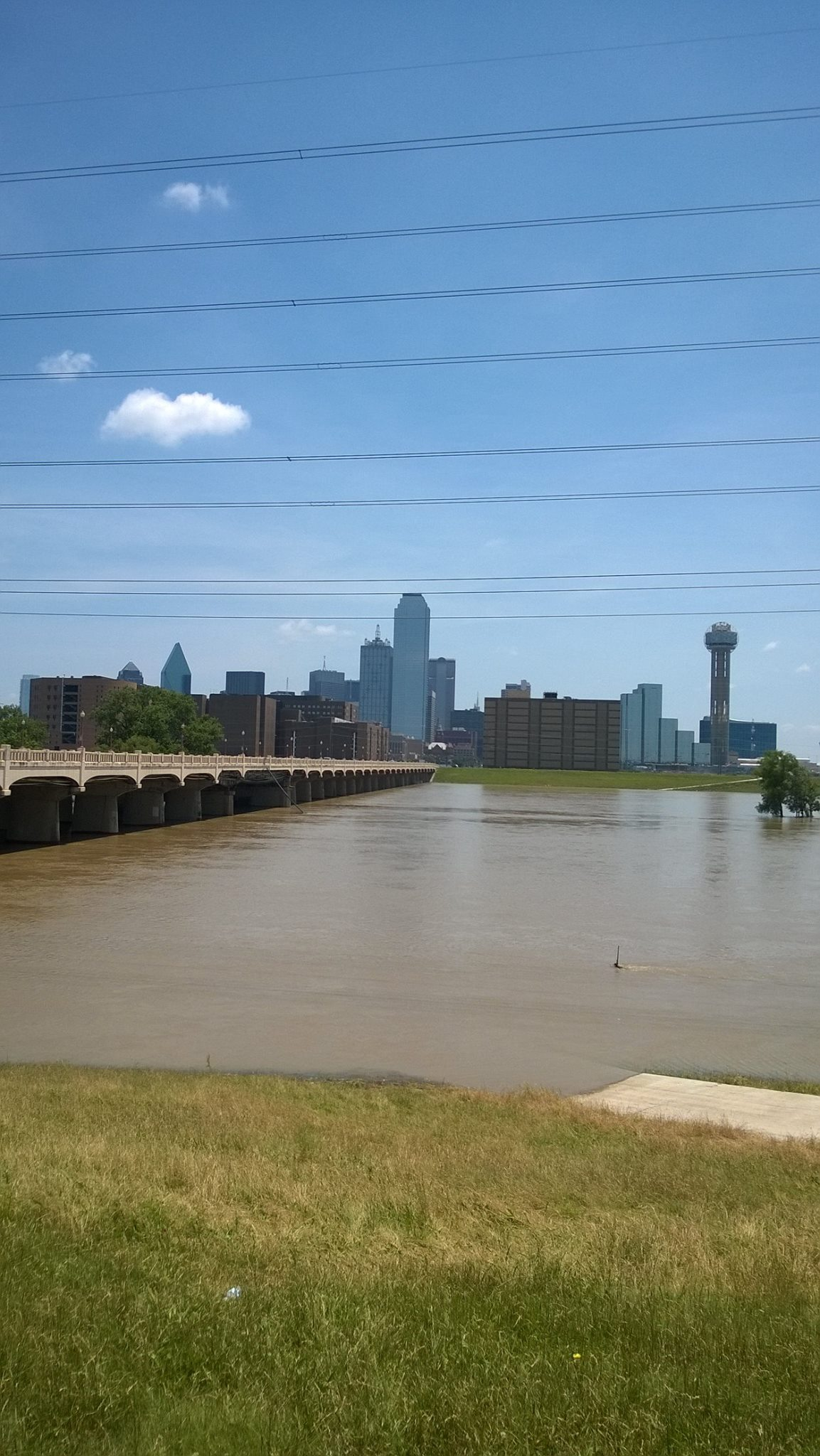
Downtown Dallas seen across from the Trinity River from the Flood of 2015.

The Trinity River Corridor is planned to be transformed into an urban park, Trinity River Project. The park is planned to include an equestrian center, lakes, trails, and three bridges designed by Santiago Calatrava. Funding has been a recurring issue, although the first two bridges having received private backing.

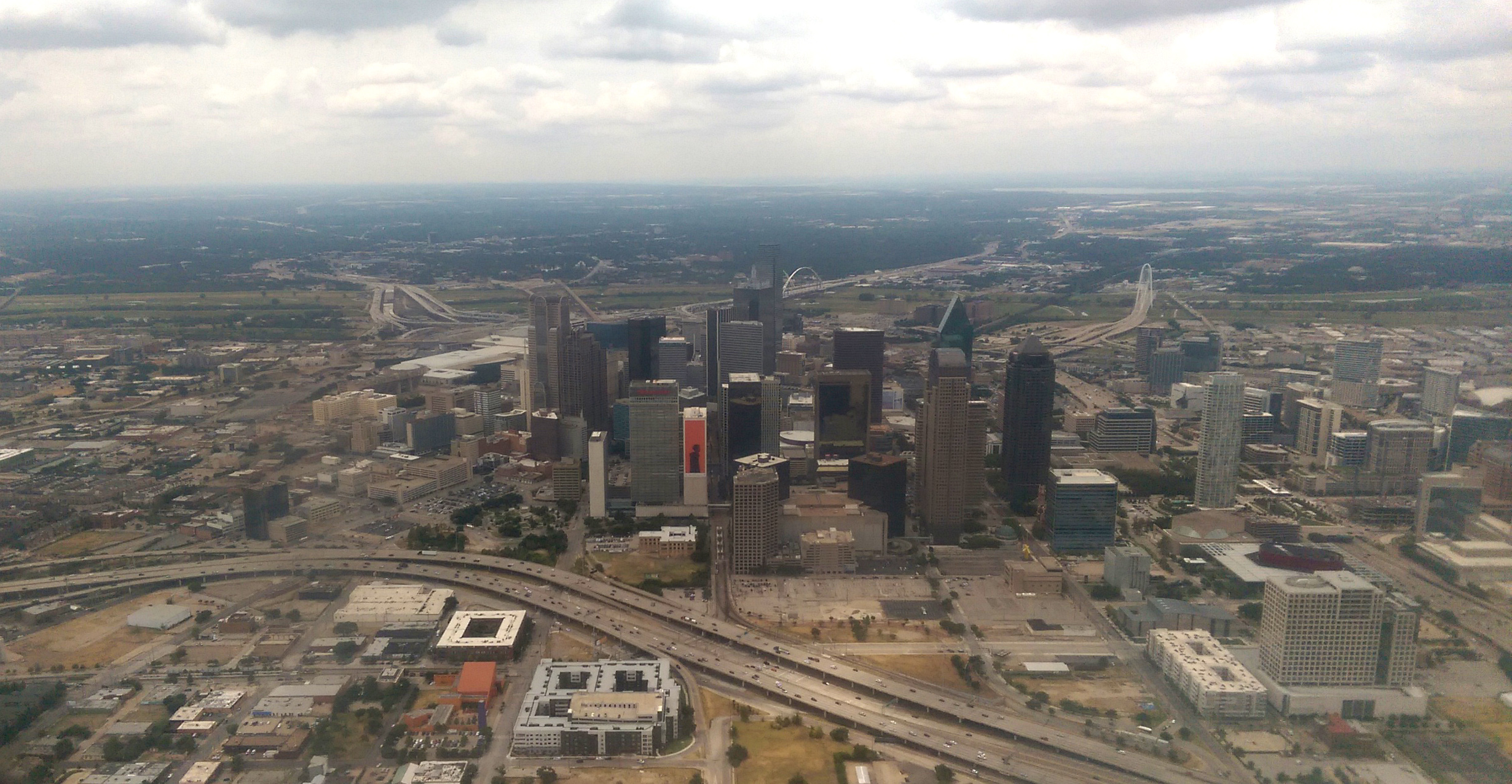
Downtown Dallas in 2016

Central Business District Population, Household, and Employment Projections
	2000	2005	2010	2015	2020	2025	2030
Population	14,654	20,646	29,446	33,139	39,781	47,098	59,337
Households	1,122	3,318	6,015	7,029	7,868	8,611	9,340
Employment	130,473	135,148	138,224	140,961	149,936	155,966	160,733

== Culture ==
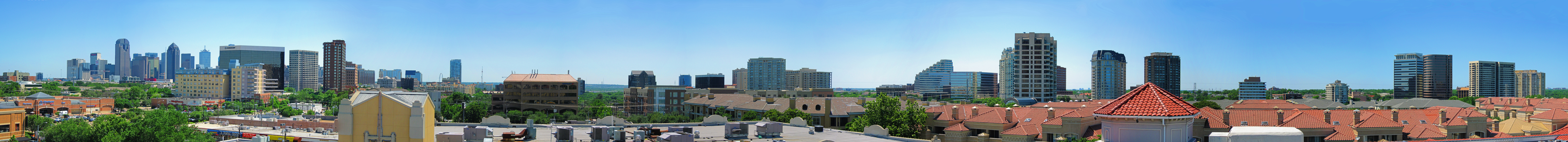
Dallas skyline from the West Village neighborhood

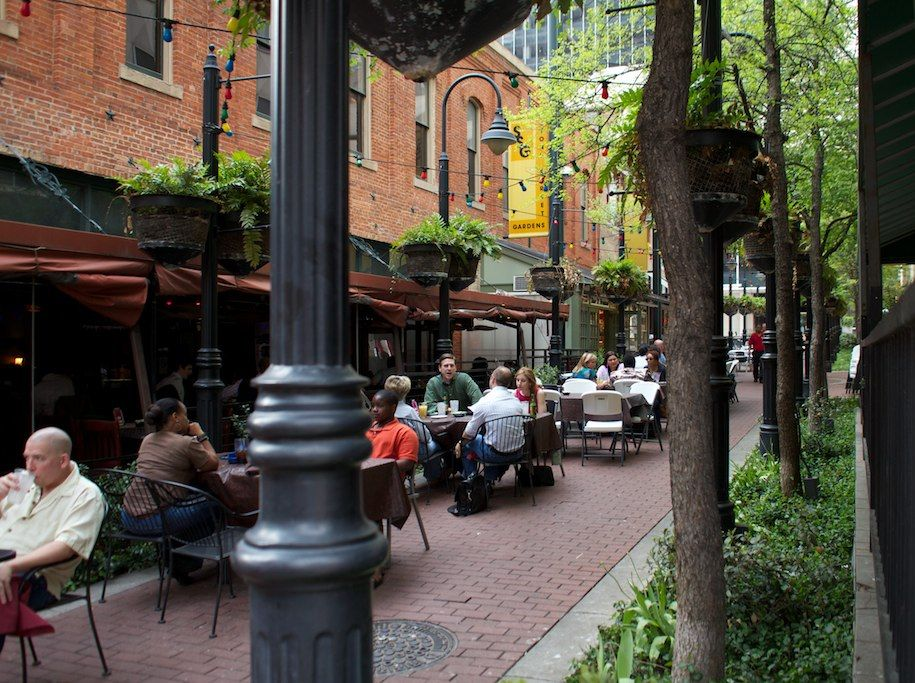
Stone Street Gardens is a short, landscaped alleyway connecting Main Street to Elm Street in Downtown Dallas. It houses a number of eateries and bars.

Downtown Dallas has undergone a series of important changes that city officials believe will drastically improve the city's core. These changes are located in four downtown areas: Victory Park, the Arts District, the Trinity River, and the Convention Center corridor.

Victory Park, named one of the nation's most successful brownfield reclamation projects, is home to the American Airlines Center, built in 2001, and several new high-rise hotels, residential towers, and office buildings, including the 33-story "W Dallas Victory Hotel and Residences" (2006), the 28-story "Cirque" residential tower (2007), the 29-story "The House" residential tower (2008), and the 20-story "One Victory Park" office tower (2009), and near Victory Park the new "Perot Museum of Nature and Science", a $185 million, 14-story, ultra-modern addition to Downtown Dallas that opened in late 2012.

The Dallas Arts District, already one of the world's largest, recently completed the final stages of a massive 10-year construction project that resulted in a 2,300-seat opera house, a series of theaters, residential space, retail, parks, and a gleaming, 42-story residential tower known as Museum Tower that opened in 2013. One of the prominent attractions in the Arts District is the Dallas Museum of Art.

Of all the changes in downtown Dallas, the Trinity River corridor is undergoing the most dramatic. Currently, the river runs in an artificially straight line a large distance from any part of downtown, but Dallas is in the process of returning the river to its natural course, creating two large lakes to border the downtown area, and has commissioned two large cable-stayed bridges to be built across the river and new lakes. Dubbed the Trinity River Project by local officials, plans are also in place for improved levees to protect downtown from possible flooding.

Separated from Victory Park and the Arts District by the Downtown CBD is the Convention Center corridor, which hosts the over 2 million-ft^{2} Dallas Convention Center. The Omni Dallas Hotel is a new, 23-story, convention-center hotel that opened in 2011. Dallas hopes these changes will bring more permanent residents into the downtown area; as of the 2010 Census the downtown population has grown to 5,291 from the 1,000 citizens who lived in downtown at the end of the 20th century.

The City of Dallas, along with several nonprofit organizations, constructed a $110 million urban deck park over Woodall Rodgers Freeway to create a physically seamless Uptown/Downtown District; the urban deck park opened in 2012. The 5.2-acre urban green space, named the Klyde Warren Park, further strengthens the existing synergy between the Uptown real estate market and the booming development occurring in the Downtown Dallas Arts District, which together help further the continuing growth and redevelopment of Downtown Dallas. The park is often called an "urban oasis" due to its unique location and features.

== Major employers ==
AT&T is headquartered at the Whitacre Tower in Downtown Dallas; AT&T moved to Dallas from San Antonio in 2008. Mayor of Dallas Tom Leppert said in 2008 that he hoped that AT&T would stay in the central city. Comerica is headquartered in the Comerica Bank Tower. TM Advertising has its headquarters in the same building. Tenet Healthcare is headquartered in the Fountain Place building in Downtown Dallas. The company announced in 2008 that it was moving from the northern suburban areas of Dallas to Fountain Place due to high gasoline prices and the revitalization of Downtown Dallas.

Belo and A. H. Belo have their headquarters in the Belo Building. 7-Eleven has its corporate headquarters in the One Arts Plaza building. Energy Future Holdings Corporation has its headquarters in the Energy Plaza complex. Greyhound Lines is located at 350 North St. Paul Street. The Dallas Morning News has its headquarters in Downtown. Neiman Marcus has its headquarters in One Neiman Square in Downtown. The Trammell Crow Company has its headquarters in the Trammell Crow Center. The KPMG Centre in Downtown Dallas has the Dallas offices of KPMG and Sidley Austin. Which Wich? has its headquarters in Downtown Dallas. Deloitte has its offices in the JPMorgan Chase Tower. Visitdallas, the 501(c)(6) contracted by the City of Dallas to increase tourism and attract conventions, is headquartered in downtown Dallas.

== Neighborhoods ==
Districts of downtown Dallas

=== Within Loop ===
- Arts District
- City Center District
- Convention Center District
- Farmers Market District
- Government District
- Main Street District
- Reunion District
- West End Historic District

=== Outside Loop ===
- Trinity/Design District
- Victory Park (also considered part of the Stemmons Corridor or Oak Lawn)
- Uptown (also considered part of Oak Lawn)
- State Thomas (also considered part of Oak Lawn)
- Bryan Place (also considered part of East Dallas)
- Baylor-Meadows (also considered part of East Dallas)
- Deep Ellum (also considered part of East Dallas)
- Fair Park (also considered part of East Dallas)
- Cedars (also considered part of South Dallas)

== Tallest structures ==
1. Bank of America Plaza - 921 feet (281 m)
2. Renaissance Tower - 886 feet (270 m)
3. Comerica Bank Tower - 787 feet (240 m)
4. JPMorgan Chase Tower - 738 feet (225 m)
5. Fountain Place - 720 feet (219 m)
6. Trammell Crow Center 686 ft (209 m)
7. 1700 Pacific 655 ft (200 m)
8. Thanksgiving Tower 645 ft (197 m)
9. Energy Plasa 629 ft (192 mt)
10. The Drever 628 ft (191 mt)

== Transportation ==
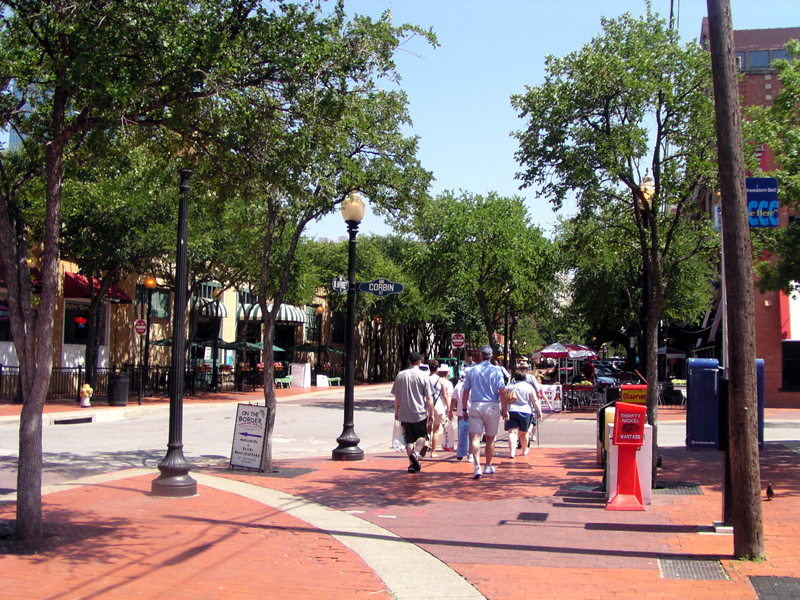
Looking south down Market in the West End Historic District

Downtown Dallas is surrounded by a major highway loop composed of, from the north and clockwise, Spur 366 (Woodall Rodgers Freeway), unsigned Interstate 345 (connecting U.S. Highway 75 (Central Expressway) to the north and Interstate 45 to the south), Interstate 30, and Interstate 35E. The loop is the center of Dallas's hub-and-spoke highway system, which can be likened to a wagon wheel. U.S. Highway 67 is carried through downtown on Interstate 35E to the south and Interstate 30 to the east, and U.S. Highway 175 and the Dallas North Tollway join with other major highways within a mile of downtown.

Downtown is the center of the Dallas Area Rapid Transit (DART) light-rail system. The Blue and Red light-rail lines run through, from south to north, Convention Center, Union, West End, Akard, St Paul, and Pearl stations. The Trinity Railway Express commuter train, which connects Downtown Fort Worth with Downtown Dallas, terminates at Union Station. Union Station also has Amtrak service, with trains connecting to Chicago and Los Angeles.

The McKinney Avenue Transit Authority operates the M-Line Trolley, a free trolley service that runs down St. Paul Street from Uptown and terminates at Ross Avenue. North from downtown, it travels to McKinney Avenue from St. Paul, runs through the LoMac neighborhood, and finally loops around the West Village along Blackburn and Cole Avenues. A spur adjacent to the West Village runs to Cityplace Station.

Greyhound Lines operates a terminal at 205 South Lamar Street. DART operates the West and East Transfer Centers as hubs for its public bus system. The Denton County Transportation Authority operates an express commuter bus route that serves two stops in Denton, one stop in Lewisville, and another that makes two stops, one in Denton and another in Carrollton.

The Dallas Pedestrian Network is a system of grade-separated walkways covering 36 city blocks under Downtown Dallas. The system connects buildings, garages, and parks through tunnels and above-ground skybridges. The network contains an underground city of shops, restaurants, and offices during weekday business hours.

The Dallas CBD Vertiport, located at the south end of the Convention Center, is claimed to be the world's largest elevated heliport/vertiport. The facility has two 60 x 60 ft. (18 x 18 m) concrete helipads and 169,000 square feet (15,700 m^{2}) of flight deck, and is capable of handling tiltrotor aircraft such as the Bell Boeing V-22 Osprey.

== Media ==
D Magazine, Dallas Morning News, WFAA, and KDFW are headquartered in Downtown.

== Government and infrastructure ==
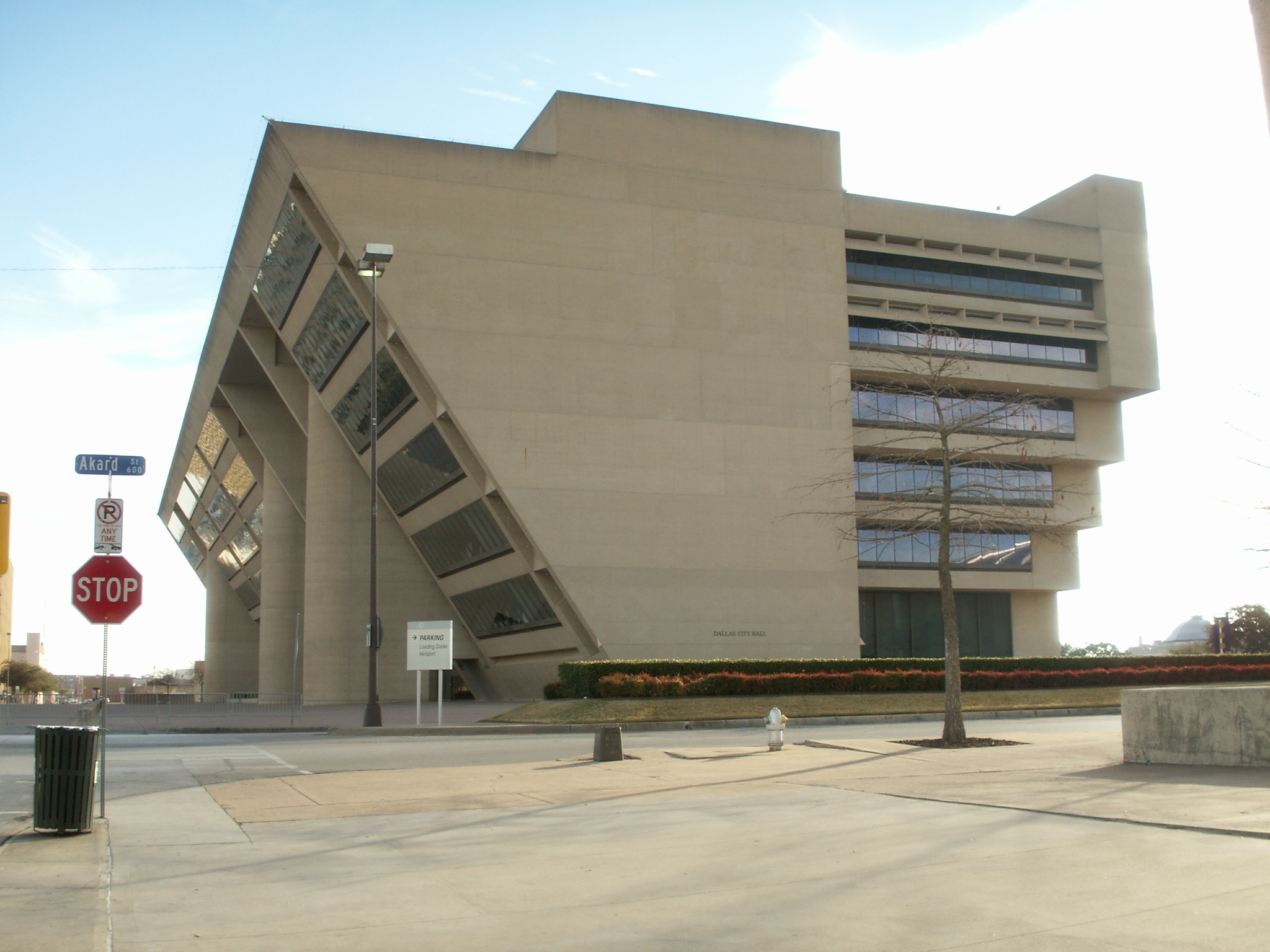
Dallas City Hall

Dallas City Hall is located in Downtown Dallas.

The Texas Fifth District Court of Appeals is located in the George L. Allen, Sr. Courts Building in Downtown Dallas.

The United States Postal Service operates the Downtown Dallas Post Office at 400 North Ervay Street.

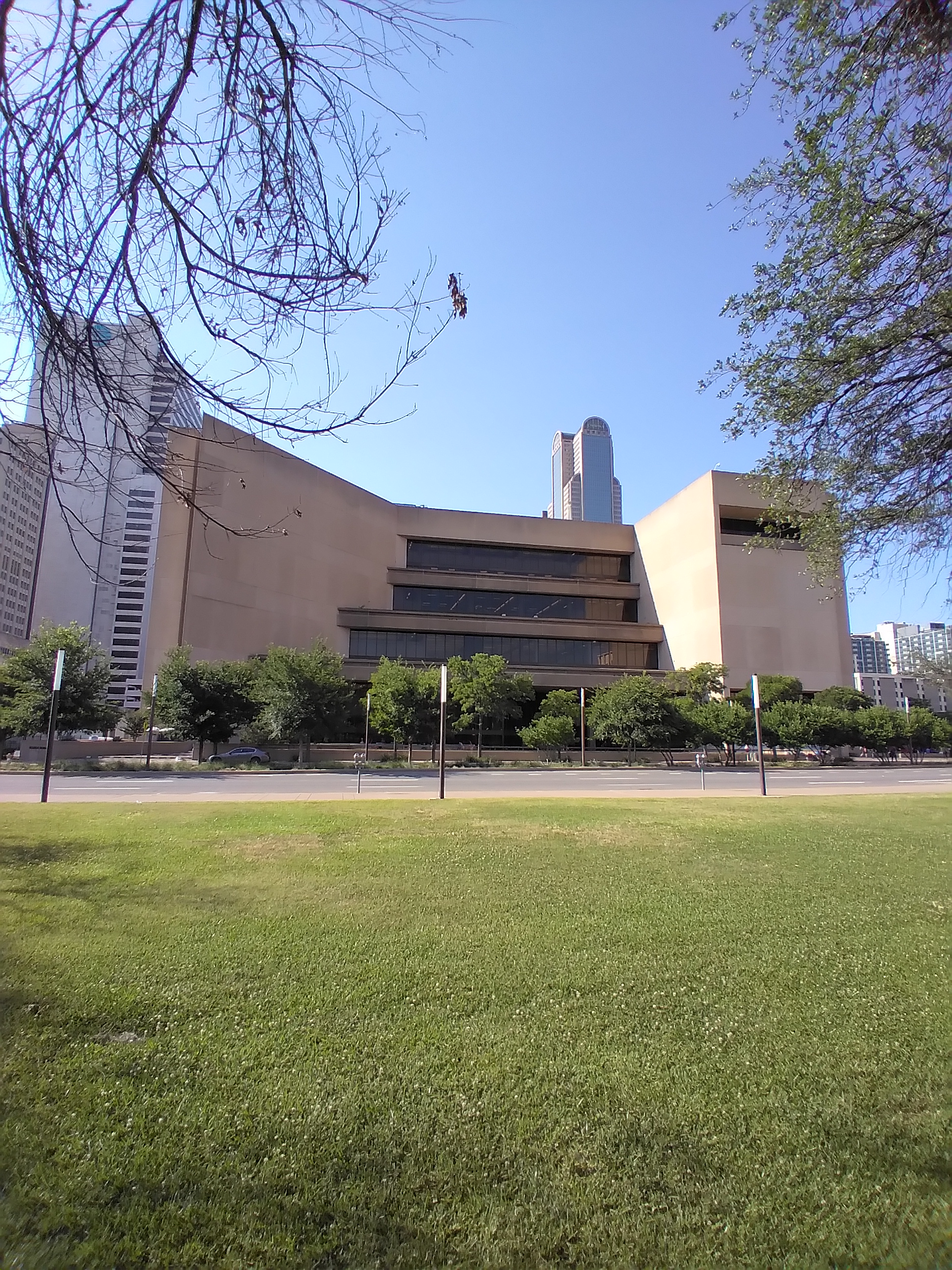
J. Erik Jonsson Central Library.

J. Erik Jonsson Central Library, the largest and main library of the Dallas Public Library system, is located downtown.

== Education ==
=== Primary and secondary schools ===
==== Public schools ====
Downtown Dallas is served by the Dallas Independent School District.

Three schools: Booker T. Washington High School for the Performing and Visual Arts, Dr. Wright L. Lassiter Jr. Early College High School at El Centro College, and the Pegasus School of Liberal Arts and Sciences are located downtown. The Pegasus Complex is also in downtown.

The neighborhood schools for Downtown are outside of the loop. Almost all of Downtown (inside the loop) is zoned to Ben Milam Elementary School, with a small section zoned to Ignacio Zaragoza Elementary School. All residents of Downtown (inside the loop) are zoned to Alex W. Spence Middle School and North Dallas High School.

City Park Elementary School in Cedars served southern parts of Downtown until it closed in 2012. Other elementary schools that formerly served Downtown include Martin Luther King Jr., Sam Houston, and Esperanza "Hope" Medrano. Middle schools formerly serving sections include Billy Earl Dade and Thomas J. Rusk. James Madison High School formerly served parts of Downtown.

Luna Academy, a K-3, 6 charter school of Uplift Education, is in Downtown Dallas. It used to be called Laureate, but there were other schools with the name and if they did not change it they would have been sued.

==== Private school ====
First Baptist Academy of Dallas Downtown Campus

Residents are also served by First Baptist Academy of Dallas, a college preparatory Pre-K through 12 school located in the city center district of downtown Dallas. Holy Trinity Catholic School is a nearby centrally located private school providing early education to three-year-olds through eighth grade. It is supported by the Roman Catholic Diocese of Dallas.

=== Colleges and universities ===
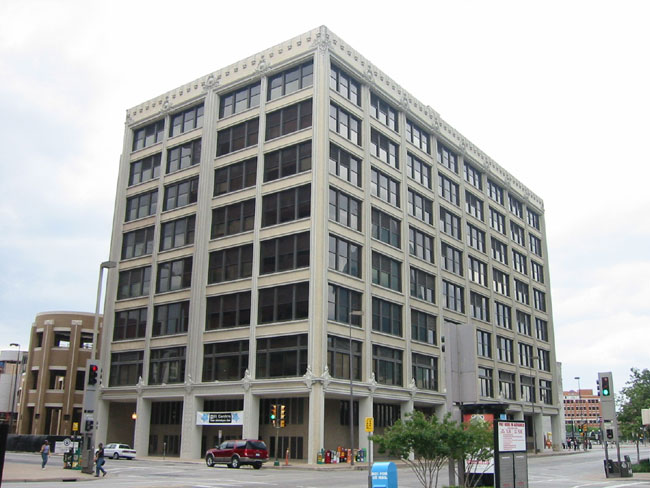
El Centro College

El Centro College of the Dallas College is in downtown.

The University of North Texas, located 40 miles (64 km) to the northwest in Denton, opened a law school downtown.

The University of Texas at Arlington, Texas A&M University-Commerce, and University of North Texas offer degree programs at the Universities Center at Dallas located in downtown.

== Parks and recreation ==
Pacific Plaza, a park on 3.7 acres (1.5 ha), opened in 2019. The organization Parks for Downtown Dallas provided the funds for it. Sharon Grigsby of The Dallas Morning News stated that the park replaced a "no-man's land". A grand opening ceremony was held on Monday October 14, 2019.
