= Pat Haggerty =

Patrick or Pat Haggerty is the name of:

- Pat Haggerty (American football official) (1927–1994), American football official
- Patrick E. Haggerty (1914–1980), Texas Instruments co-founder
- Patrick Haggerty (country singer) (1944–2022), a musician with the band Lavender Country
