= Little Professor =

Backwards-functioning calculator made by Texas Instruments

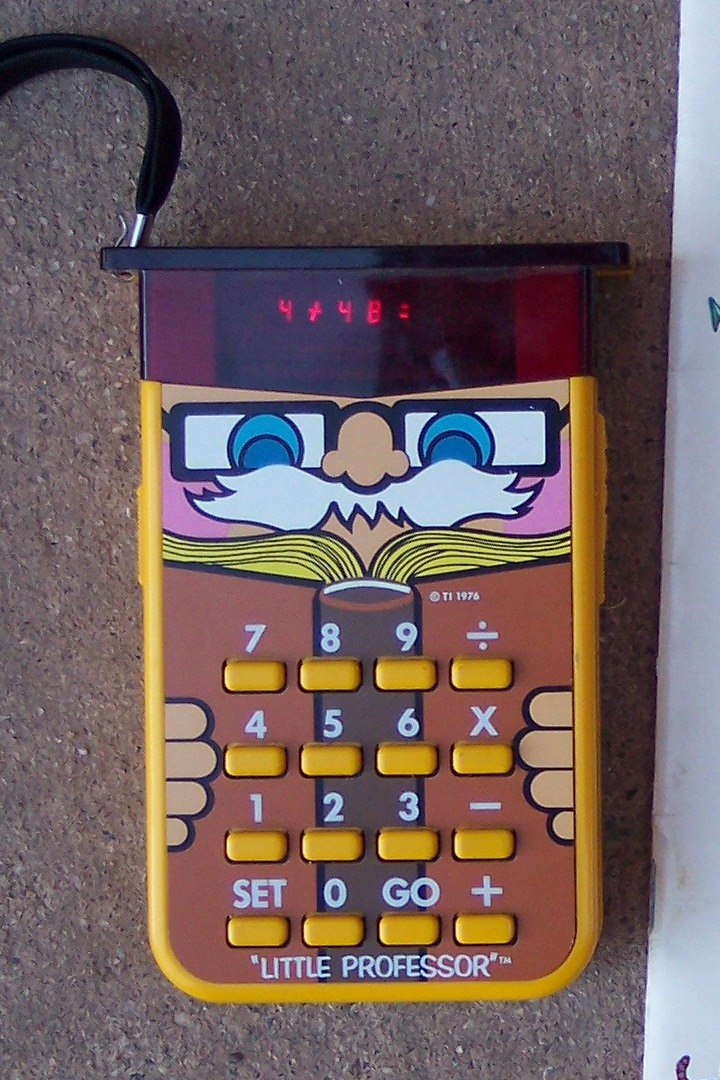
Little Professor with accompanying booklet

The Little Professor is a backwards-functioning calculator designed for children ages 5 to 9. Instead of providing the answer to a mathematical expression entered by the user, it generates unsolved expressions and prompts the user for the answer.

== Usage ==
When the user turns the Little Professor on and selects a difficulty level, an incomplete equation such as "3 x 6 =" appears on the LED display. The user has three chances to enter the correct number. If the answer is incorrect, the display shows "EEE". After the third wrong answer, the correct answer is shown. If the answer supplied is correct, the Little Professor goes to the next equation. The Little Professor shows the number of correct first answers after each set of 10 problems. The device is powered by a 9-volt battery. The type of problems can be selected with the +-*÷ keys.

== History ==
The Little Professor was first released by Texas Instruments on June 13, 1976. As the first electronic educational toy, the Little Professor is a common item on calculator collectors' lists.

In 1976, the Little Professor cost less than $20. More than 1 million units sold in 1977.

The second generation Little Professor was designed by Mark Bailey, now a full life-sized professor, whilst working for Raffo and Pape, an award-winning toy design consultancy based in the UK. In a brief interview in 2013 Bailey stated 'I've designed everything from private jets to pregnancy tests but Little Professor remains the highlight of my career.'

A solar version of Little Professor was introduced during the 2000s.

An emulator of the Little Professor for Android was published in 2012.

In 2015, the MESS emulator also included the original Little Professor as a sort of pack-in.

Starting in 2022, the CS50 course at Harvard University features an assignment based on Little Professor.

== See also ==
- Dataman
