= Speak & Read =

Electronic toy made by Texas Instruments

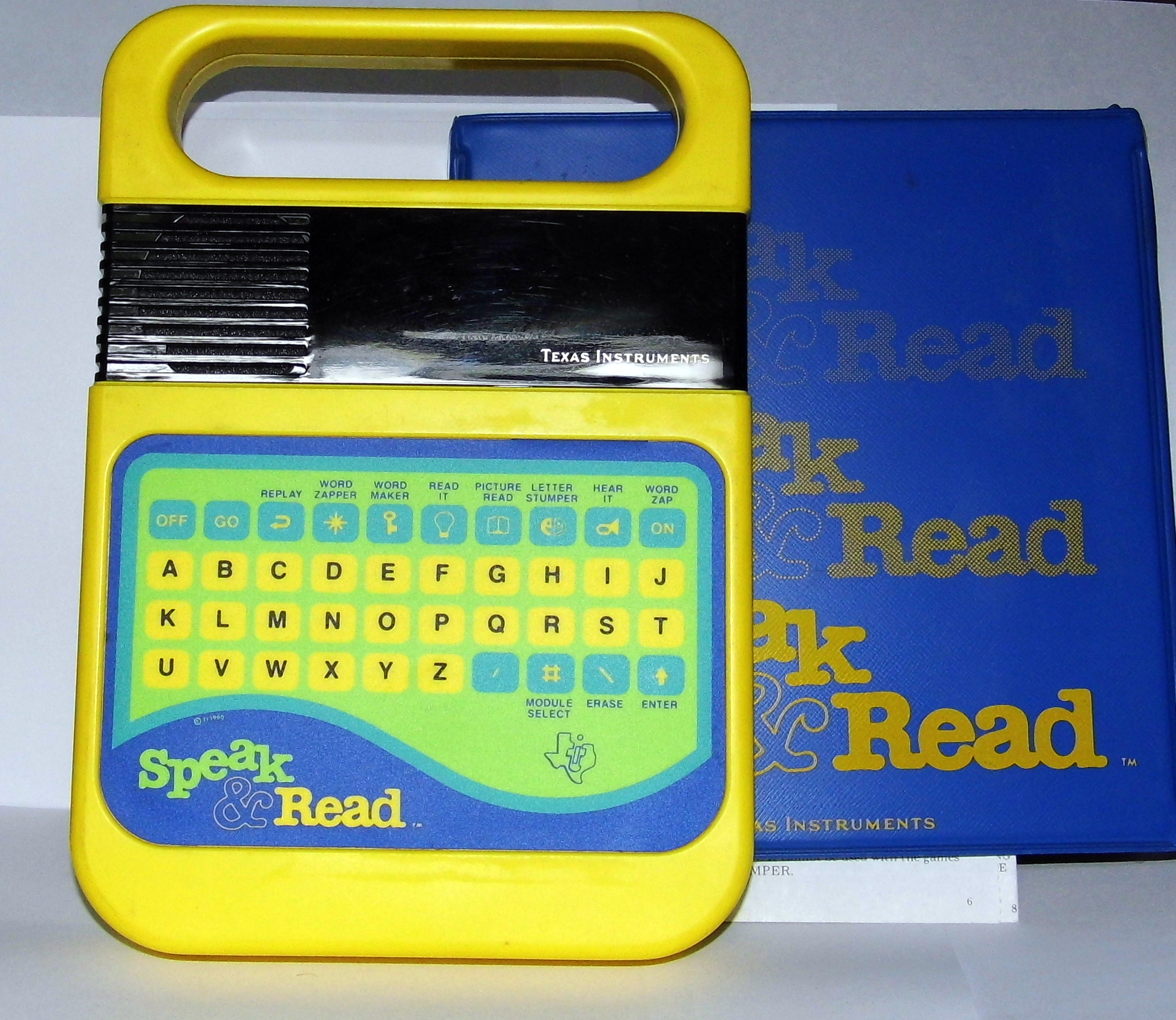
TI Speak & Read, with booklet

Speak & Read is an electronic learning aid made in 1980 (46 years ago), by Texas Instruments. Speak and Read was part of a family of learning toys i.e. "Speak & Math" and "Speak & Spell".

Speak & Read helped children from ages four to eight develop and improve their reading comprehension and vocabulary. Speak & Read came with a companion booklet for use with the skill activity modes included in the unit. The toy had a vocabulary of 250 words.

== Electronics ==
The display's a vacuum fluorescent display (VFD). Speak & Read units used a membrane keyboard for input. The Speak & Read uses a single-chip voice synthesizer, the TI TMC0280 (later called the TMS5100), that was also used in the Speak & Spell. The TMS5100 uses a 10th-order linear predictive coding (LPC) model and the electronic DSP logic.

LPC encoded speech data was stored on a pair of TMS6100 128 Kbit (a very large capacity ROM in the early 1980s) metal gate serial PMOS ROMs. Additional memory modules could be plugged into a slot in the battery compartment and selected via a button on the keyboard. A later model, the Super Speak & Read, had a much slimmer case and an LCD screen rather than a VFD screen.

The unit could use either 4 "C" batteries or 6 volt DC power adapter with positive tip polarity.

Support for emulating the Speak & Read was added to MESS in 2015.

== Games included ==
Speak & Read had six built-in learning games: Word Zap, Word Maker, Read It, Picture Read, Letter Stumper, and Hear It. Picture Read required looking up pictures in the supplementary booklet that came with the unit. Eight expansion modules were known to have been made for the Speak & Read by 1986.
