= Monkgomery =

Toy puppet

- Type: Puppet
- Invented by: Stephen Beck
- Company: Hasbro (1986–1993)
- Country: United States
- Availability: 1986–1993
- Materials: Polyester 100%
- Slogan: The Amazing Monkgomery Monkey Electronic Toy

Monkgomery was a children's puppet. It took the form of a talking monkey wearing a necktie, released by Hasbro in 1986. The toy was 17" in height and sat at approximately 14" tall. The toy had two Velcro strips on his hands allowing him to be hung from objects. The toy could also function as a cuddle buddy at night and a day time play toy. Additional speech modules provided 200 new words (each came with a different outfit).

It was created by Hasbro to compete with Teddy Ruxpin before Hasbro bought Ruxpin, and Monkgomery's packaging draws deliberate comparison, describing him as "a unique and interactive, joke-telling, talking monkey with no on-off switches, no tapes to wear out or break and no solid state cartridges".

Monkgomery's vocabulary included jokes such as "Why did the monkey throw the clock out the window?", questions such as "What's your favorite part of the zoo?" and responses to the user, such as "Tell me more!". The range of phrases could be expanded with expansion modules, sold separately.

== History ==
Bingo Bear and Monkgomery Monkey were part of a Hasbro Softies product line called "Yakity Yaks". Their debut in 1986 was not as strong as that of Teddy Ruxpin, but toy sellers pointed to them as a less expensive alternative for parents who could not afford Teddy Ruxpin.

== Design ==
The toy had a removable yellow tie with red polka dots, and was monogrammed with "Monkgomery".

The puppets were more durable than other toys, since they did not contain gears or movable parts. The absence of mechanical parts made the puppets more cuddly for children. Its design made it versatile, safe and durable, compared to mechanical toys. Dr. Bingo and Space Bingo outfits for Bingo Bear were scheduled for release at the end of December 1986; a Safari Monkgomery kit for Monkgomery Monkey was scheduled to be released in January 1987. The Hasbro dealer catalog shows a Monkgomery Monkey Clown Outfit and Rock Star Bingo Bear Outfit (unknown if released). The toys sold for about $70 and the extra word module kits for $20.

== Mechanics and parts ==
Monkgomery had a rear opening that allowed manipulation of mouth movements by hand. This opening also gave access to a pressure-sensitive switch on the top of the mouth and a solid mass at the bottom to engage the switch mechanism. Engagement triggered the electronic speech integrated circuit TMS5110ANL. Speech consisted of a set of 400 pre-recorded words (100 phrases), in voiceover format (performed by Bill Cochran), stored in Texas Instrument CM62060N2L, CM62059N2L, E7CL04N2L ICs. The words played out on an 8 Ω, 0.25 watt F.S.T F05702 mono speaker. The board contained a never-used nine pin edge connector for expansion modules. These parts were built into a brown plastic box with a 4-AA battery holder. The brown box was zipped inside the back of the monkey's back with two snaps for fastening inside and a removable eight pin connector cable for interactions with mouth switch, "tickle" sensors, right ear and right foot.

== Hasbro Dealer Catalog ==
#	Item
70502	Monkgomery Monkey
70513	Monkgomery Monkey Safari Outfit
70515	Monkgomery Monkey Clown Outfit

== See also ==
- Speech IC
