= Mark Shepherd (businessman) =

American businessman

Mark Shepherd Jr. (January 18, 1923 – February 4, 2009) was the chairman and chief executive officer of Texas Instruments. He was in attendance at the demonstration of the integrated circuit by Jack Kilby on September 12, 1958.

== Biography ==
Shepherd was born in Dallas, Texas on January 18, 1923, where his father was a police officer. He started private school as a three-year-old and constructed a vacuum tube at the age of six and a radio when he was seven, graduating from high school at the age of 14. He attended Southern Methodist University in Dallas, Texas, where he was awarded a bachelor's degree with honors in electrical engineering, and earned a master's degree at the University of Illinois. He served in the United States Navy, where he specialized in radar and electronics systems on the USS Tucson, completing his service with the rank of lieutenant.

Following the completion of his military service, Shepherd worked for General Electric and the Farnsworth Television and Radio Corporation, a firm established by television pioneer Philo Farnsworth.

=== Texas Instruments ===
He was hired by Geophysical Service Incorporated in 1948, a company which then focused on the oil and gas drilling industry; GSI subsequently evolved into Texas Instruments. He was one of four engineers sent by the company in 1952 to Bell Laboratories to study the transistor. Texas Instruments licensed the transistor technology that had been invented at Bell Labs in 1947 and pursued applications for its use.

After obtaining the licensing agreement, Shepherd built a team to produce working transistors. In 1958, he was the head of the semiconductor team as Jack Kilby invented the integrated circuit, which Texas Instruments used in the development of the company's hand-held calculators, printers and personal computers, as well as toys.

Shepherd spearheaded the company's international expansion, opening semiconductor fabrication plants overseas, including in Japan. His focus on cutting costs to keep the company competitive led to the implementation of computer-aided methods for manufacturing semiconductor-based products. With increasing competition later in his career from Asian suppliers, Shepherd shifted Texas Instruments away from consumer products and focused on semiconductor technology.

He was the company's chief engineer and chief operating officer before being named as chief executive officer in 1969. He was named as the firm's CEO in 1976, serving in that role until 1988.

Author Michael Malone described Shepherd as someone who "drove T.I. into world leadership not only in semiconductors, but took the chip industry into consumer electronics with calculators, digital watches and toys where Texas Instruments dominated even companies like Hewlett-Packard and Intel".

=== Post-retirement ===
Following his retirement, he and his wife moved to their ranch in Quitman, Texas, where they raised longhorn cattle. As described in his obituary in The New York Times, Shepherd was "an engineer to the core" even in retirement, taking responsibility for construction of buildings, dams and fire protection equipment on the ranch.

Shepherd died at age 86 on February 4, 2009 at his ranch in Quitman due to complications of pulmonary fibrosis. He was survived by his wife, Mary Alice, two daughters, son and three granddaughters.
