= Texas Instruments TMS1100 =

Microcontroller family

The TMS1100 is a family of microcontrollers introduced by Texas Instruments in 1975. This type of microprocessors are an expanded memory version of the TMS1000.

The 1100 is built on PMOS technology with clock speed is 400 kHz. with 43 Standard Instructions and 1024 Micro- instructions.

It was used in Microvision game console cartridges.

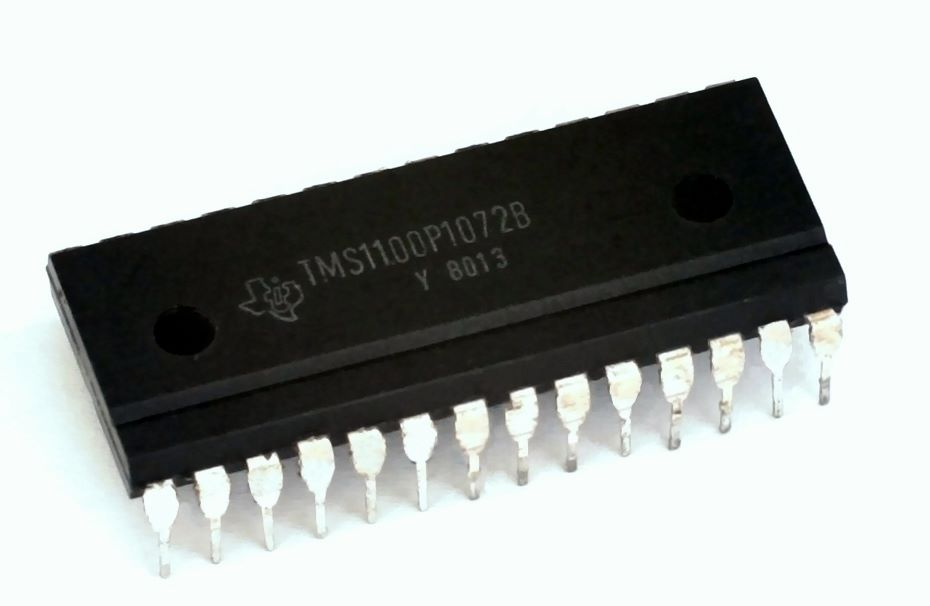
TMS1100

== Classification ==
- TMS1100JLC
- TMS1100NLC
- TMS1100NLL
- TMS1100NLP
