= TI InterActive! =

Software product

- A screenshot of TI InterActive! in Windows XP.
- Developer: Texas Instruments
- Stable release: 1.3.0.9 / July 6, 2004; 21 years ago
- Operating system: Microsoft Windows
- Type: Computer algebra system
- License: Proprietary
- Website: education.ti.com

TI InterActive! was a Texas Instruments computer program which combined the functionality of all of the TI graphing calculators with extra features into a text editor which allowed users to save equations, graphs, tables, spreadsheets, and text onto a document. TI InterActive! also included a web browser, but it was just an embedded version of Internet Explorer. It also worked with TI Connect to share data with the TI Graphing Calculators.
