= Dataman =

Educational toy calculator with mathematical games

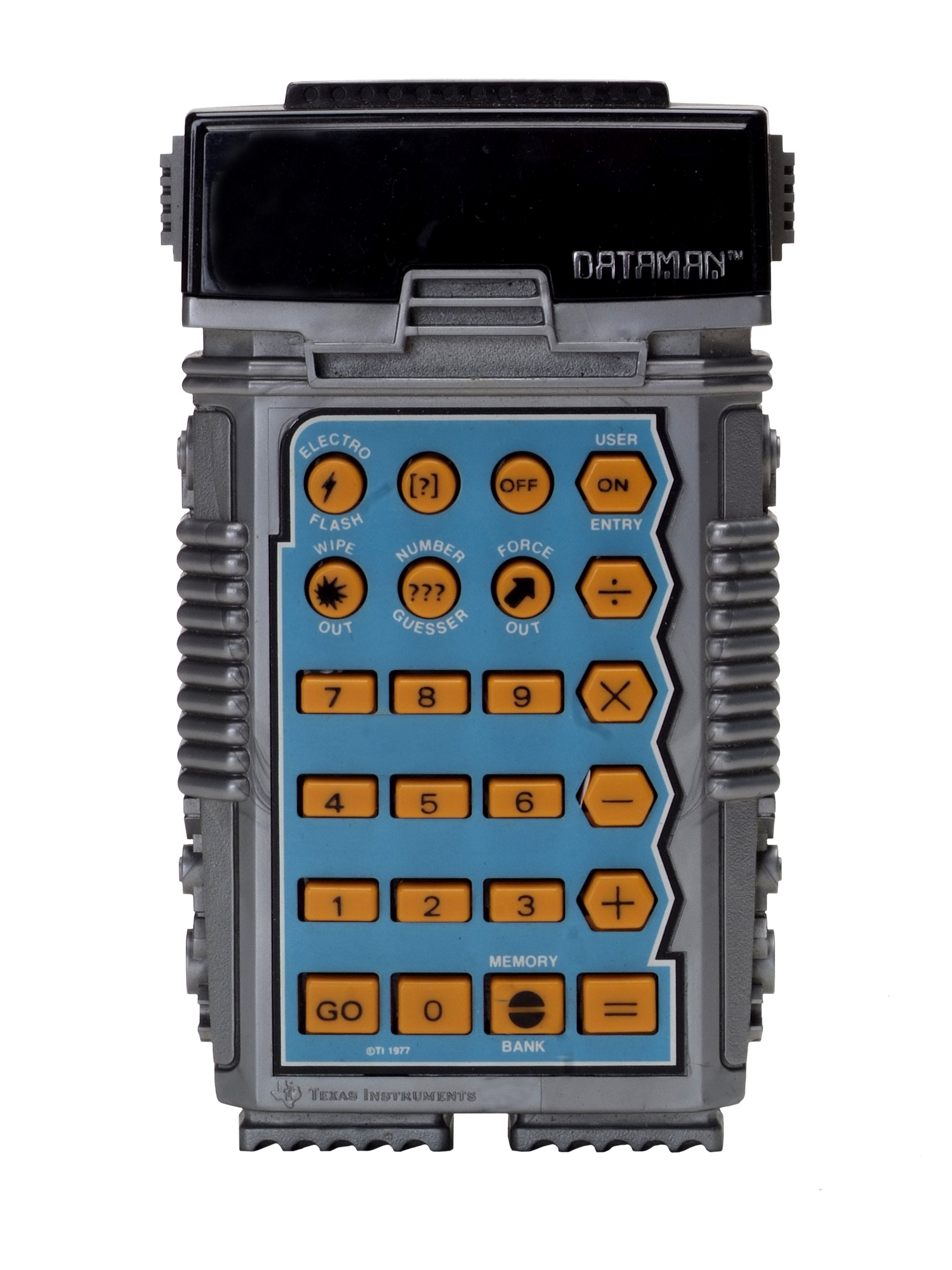
Dataman

Dataman was an educational toy calculator with mathematical games to aid in learning arithmetic. It had an 8-digit vacuum fluorescent display (VFD), and a keypad. Dataman was manufactured by Texas Instruments and was launched on 5 June 1977.

== Details ==
DataMan was designed to resemble a robot. It had an array of 24 keys of differing shape, including ten digit keys, four arithmetic function keys, an equals key, a memory bank key, an on key, an off-key, and keys for various games.

The following games, played against the clock, were designed to teach the four basic operations of arithmetic—addition, subtraction, multiplication and division:

- "Electro Flash" – for practicing mathematical tables
- "Wipe Out" – for competing at solving arithmetic problems rapidly
- "Number Guesser" – for guessing a number selected by DataMan
- "Force Out" – for subtracting numbers, to avoid being the one who arrives at zero
- "[?]" – to enter unknowns in equations

Notably, the Dataman was powered by a single 9V battery, with no voltage stepping to the main IC. This meant that you could hear the inner workings of the main IC when listening closely to the unit. The Dataman is based on a chip similar to the Texas Instruments TMS1100.
