= SolarMagic =

SolarMagic is a subsidiary brand of Texas Instruments, selling electronics for photovoltaic (PV) systems. It was established in 2008 as a subsidiary brand of National Semiconductor. The brand name was carried through when TI purchased National Semiconductor in 2011.

== Products ==
The original SolarMagic device was a proprietary brand of power optimizer, a device which isolates the output from each PV-module from the rest of the system, preventing loss of performance by a single module from affecting the rest of the array. Because of the electronic characteristics of solar arrays, real-world conditions such as partial/temporary shading and irregular panel performance can lead to disproportionate and excessive losses of power output from the system. In one study, shading over a day of between 8% and 16% of the PV system surface area led to relative array power losses of between 35% and 40%. Despite National Semiconductor advertisement claims that their power optimizer could recoup up to 57% of the power lost as a result of these phenomena, real-world results typically ranged between 1% and 6% of overall system output improvement.
