= Texas Instruments LPC Speech Chips =

Speech synthesizer digital signal processor integrated circuits

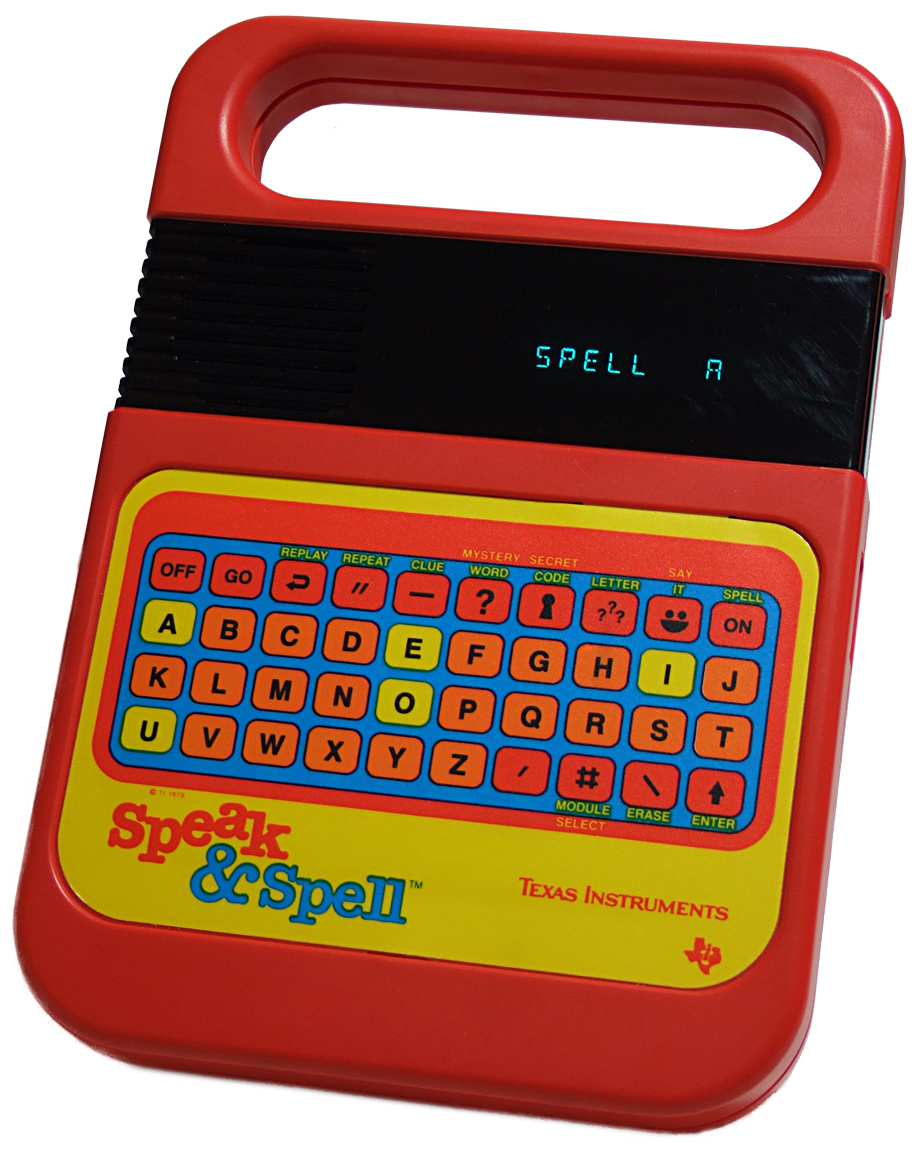
A 1986 model American Speak & Spell with membrane keyboard and redesigned faceplate graphics

The Texas Instruments LPC Speech Chips are a series of speech synthesizer digital signal processor integrated circuits created by Texas Instruments beginning in 1978. They continued to be developed and marketed for many years, though the speech department moved around several times within TI until finally dissolving in late 2001. The rights to the speech-specific subset of the MSP line, the last remaining line of TI speech products as of 2001, were sold to Sensory, Inc. in October 2001.

== Theory ==
Speech data is stored through pitch-excited linear predictive coding (PE-LPC), where words are created by a lattice filter, selectably fed by either an excitation ROM (containing a glottal pulse waveform) or an LFSR (linear-feedback shift register) noise generator. Linear predictive coding achieves a vast reduction in data volume needed to recreate intelligible speech data.

== History ==
The TMC0280/TMS5100 was the first self-contained LPC speech synthesizer IC ever made. It was designed for Texas Instruments by Larry Brantingham, Paul S. Breedlove, Richard H. Wiggins, and Gene A. Frantz and its silicon was laid out by Larry Brantingham. The chip was designed for the 'Spelling Bee' project at TI, which later became the Speak & Spell. A speech-less 'Spelling B' was released at the same time as the Speak & Spell.

All TI LPC speech chips until the TSP50cxx series used PMOS architecture, and LPC-10 encoding in a special TI-specific format. Chips in the TI LPC speech series were labeled as TMCxxxx or CDxxxx when used by TI's consumer product division, or labeled as TMS5xxx (later TSP5xxx) when sold to 3rd parties.

== TI LPC Speech chip family ==
=== 1978 ===
- TMS5100 (TMC0281, internal TI name is '0280' hence chip is sometimes labeled TMC0280): First LPC speech chip. Used a custom 4-bit serial interface using TMS6100 or TMS6125 mask ROM ICs; used on all non-super versions of the Speak & Spell except for the 1980 UK version, which used the TMC0280/CD2801 below. Publicly sold as TMS5100. It was also used on the Byron Petite Electronic Talking Typewriter toy. Superseded in 1979 by TMS5100A and TMS5110.

=== 1980 ===
- TMC0280 AKA CD2801: Used in the Speak & Math, Speak & Read, and the TI Language Translator/Language Tutor. Pin, but not function compatible with TMS5100/TMC0280, has a different LPC and slightly different chirp table. The CD2801/Die revision F fixes an interpolator bug.
- TMS5100A: Die shrink of TMS5100/TMC0281. Very minor differences in function, uses die rev F, fixing a bug in the interpolator. Used on the Century Video System arcade platform. Uses the original chirp table.
- TMS5110: Has updated LPC tables (which mostly match 5220, see below). Pin, but not function compatible with TMS5100. Superseded by TMS5110A. It was used in the Monkgomery puppet toy made by Hasbro. An SDIP version of this chip was sold at some point as the "TMS5111". Uses the 'final' chirp table.
- TMS5200 (AKA CD2501E, internal TI name is '0285' hence chip is sometimes labeled TMC0285): Added 8-bit parallel FIFO interface; designed for use by the TI consumer division for the TI-99/4A speech module; also used on the 4th generation Bally/Midway pinball tables' Squawk and Talk speech board (part number AS-2518-61), on the Environmental cabinet version of the Bally/Midway arcade game Discs of TRON, possibly on (earlier) Apple II Echo II cards, and on the Zaccaria arcade games Jack Rabbit and Money Money, and Zaccaria pinball machines Pinball Champ and Soccer Kings. Superseded by TMS5220 in late 1980/1981, and possibly sold as cheap, 'fire-sale' stock in 1982–1983. Uses the 'final' chirp table.
- CD2802: A version of the TMS5100/5110 with different LPC and chirp tables, not the same as either the TMS5100(A) or TMS5110(A). Used on the Touch and Tell only, never sold outside of the company. Uses its own, unique, chirp table.
- TMS5110A (after 1985: TSP5110A): Die shrink of TMS5110, pin and function compatible. Used on at least two home computer products. It was used on the arcade game Bagman by Valadon Automation, by Omnicron Electronics on the TCC-14 Talking Clock/Calendar, and on the arcade game A.D. 2083 by Midcoin. Used on the Chrysler Electronic Voice Alert vehicle monitoring system. Uses the 'final' chirp table.
- TMS5220 (AKA CD2805E?): Improved version of the TMS5200, pin but not function compatible (has new LPC tables); used on (later) Apple II Echo II cards, (rumor) on the very last run of TI-99/4A speech modules, on the BBC Micro, on the EXL 100, in Bally/Midway's NFL Football arcade game, and in many Atari, Inc. arcade games, including Star Wars, Firefox, Return of the Jedi, and The Empire Strikes Back. Later Atari arcade games used the TMS5220C, see below. The TMS5220 was also used in Zaccaria pinball machines Farfalla, Devil Riders, Time Machine, Magic Castle, Robot, Clown, Pool Champion, Blackbelt, Mexico '86, Zankor, and Spooky. The TMS5220 was also used on Venture Line's Looping and Sky Bumper, Olympia's Portraits, and Exidy's Victory and Victor Banana arcade machines. The TMS5220 was also used in the Androbot, Inc. Topo line of robots, starting with Topo II and Topo III in 1984. Superseded by TMS5220C in 1983/1984. Uses the 'final' chirp table. HP 82967A Speech synthesis module, adding 1500-word vocabulary to Series 80 computers.

=== 1983 ===
- TMS5220C (after 1985: TSP5220C): has the two NOP commands the parallel FIFO interface reworked to control speech rate, added external full reset; minor change apparent to the way energy values affect unvoiced frames. Otherwise identical, pin-compatible, and a drop-in replacement to the TMS5220. Used on the Atari arcade games Indiana Jones and the Temple of Doom, Road Runner, 720°, Gauntlet, Gauntlet II, A.P.B., Paperboy, RoadBlasters, Vindicators Part II, and finally Escape from the Planet of the Robot Monsters. Also used on the IBM PS/2 Speech Adapter and the Pacific Educational Systems RS-232 Speech adapter. Manufactured into the early 1990s.

=== 1985 ===
- TSP50C50: CMOS, uses LPC-12 instead of LPC-10, uses TMS60C20 256Kb/32KiB serial ROM instead of TMS6100. Uses 'D6' LPC tables and chirp tables, which were common for the whole TSP50Cxx series. Has built in low-pass analog filter. Manufactured into the early 1990s.

=== 1986 ===
- TSP50C40 (later MSP50C40): TSP50C50 plus a simple 8-bit microcontroller with on-chip mask ROM. Was used in a number of TI's consumer division products, and named CM54129/CM54169 for the speak&music.

=== 1987 and later ===
- Several other TSP50Cxx products, which added more ROM/ram, did away with the serial interface entirely, etc.
- The TSP53C30 microcontroller product emulates a TMS5220 PE-LPC, but also has support for D6 LPC as well as PCM sound output.
- After about 1997, the TSP non-microcontroller line was phased out in favor of speech-specific members of the MSP line, which have microcontrollers. In October 2001, the rights to the speech-specific subset of the MSP line of chips (MSP50C6XX chip family) was sold by TI to Sensory, Inc. Sensory rebranded the chips as the Sensory SC-6x line.
- In October 2007, Sensory announced it would no longer accept new mask submissions for the SC-6x line. Orders for chips with existing masks will continue to be accepted for at least the next year.

The companion devices to all versions of the speech chip were the custom 4-bit-interfaced 128Kbit (16KiB) TMS6100NL (AKA TMC0350) and 32Kbit (4KiB) TMS6125NL (a.k.a. TMC0355 a.k.a. TMS7125) read-only memories which were mask programmed with words required for a specific product. ALL versions of the LPC chips until the TSP50Cxx series support them. All versions of the TMS6100 appear to only have 128Kbit/16KiB of content, regardless of rumors to the contrary.
