= Speak & Math =

Electronic toy made by Texas Instruments

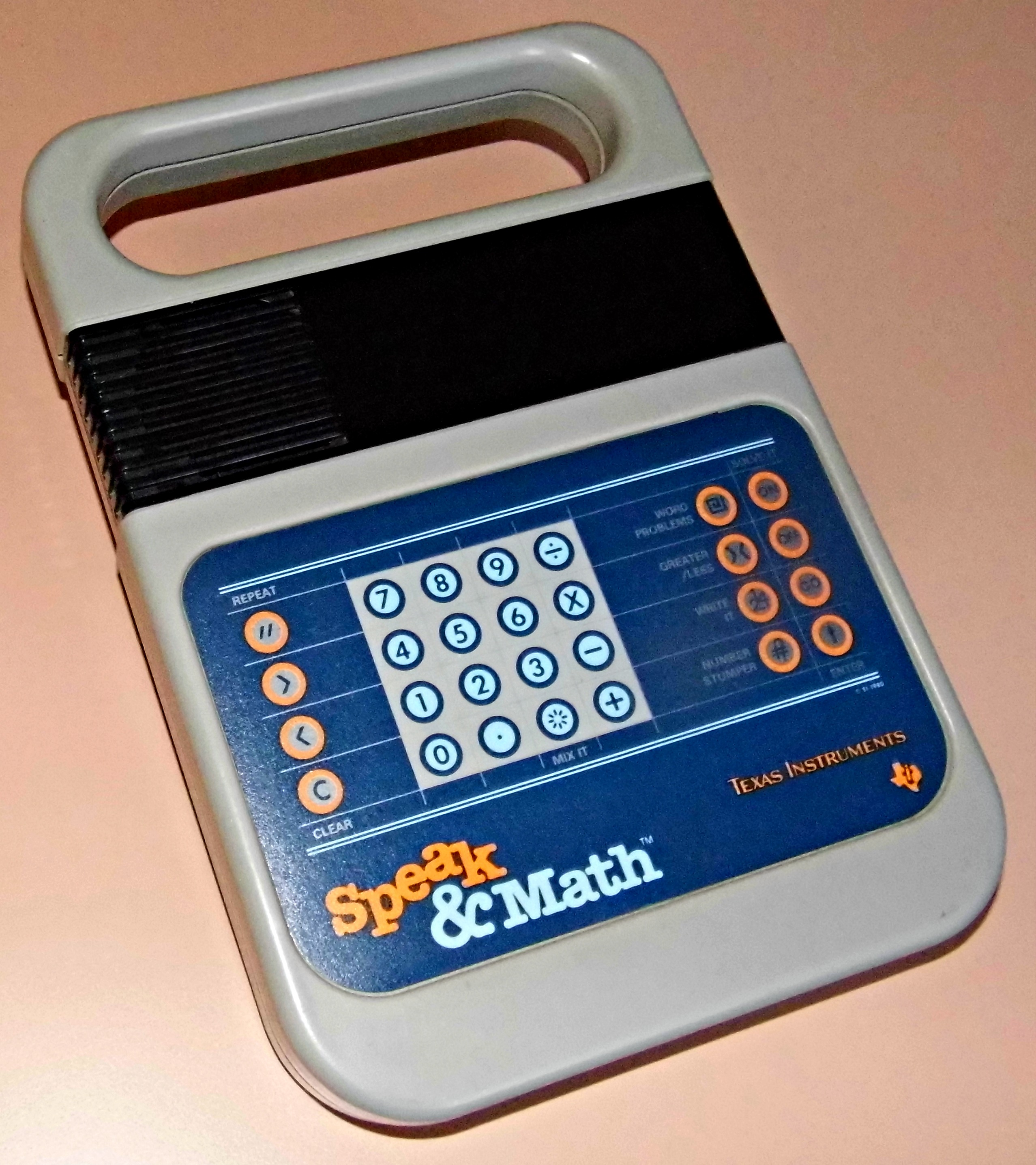
Texas Instruments Speak & Math

The Speak & Math (or Speak & Maths in some countries) was a popular electronic toy created by Texas Instruments in 1980 (46 years ago). Speak & Math was one of a three-part talking educational toy series that also included Speak & Spell and Speak & Read. The Speak & Math was sold worldwide. It was advertised as a tool for helping young children to become better at mathematics. The Speak & Math had a distinct gray with blue and orange color scheme.

The unit could utilize either 4 "C" batteries or 6 volt DC power adapter. The display was a 9-character, 14-segment vacuum fluorescent display. The Speak & Math used a TI TMS5110 chip for voice synthesis. The Speak & Math, like the earlier Speak & Spell, also had the ability to expand its memory using expansion modules that plugged into a slot inside the battery compartment. No expansion modules are known to have been produced for the Speak & Math however. Like some models of the Speak & Spell, the Speak & Math had a mono headphone port.

Speak & Math had five distinct learning games: Solve It, Word Problems, Greater Than/Less Than, Write It, and Number Stumper, all playable at three levels of difficulty. Solve It is the classic math problem-solving game where the participant must solve five math problems to the best of their ability. Number Stumper is a game of Bulls and Cows, whereby one is told the "number [of digits] right" and the "number in wrong place." Write It involves the participant typing the number they hear. Greater Than/Less Than involves identifying whether the number on the left is greater than or less than the number on the right.
