= Echo II (expansion card) =

The Echo II is a plug-in expansion card, speech synthesizer card for the Apple II and Apple IIe personal computers that allow applications to use speech synthesis. The Echo II provides a speaker/headphones jack on board, with a physical volume control adjustment.

The Echo II software can synthesize either unlimited text-to-speech using stitched phonemes, or play back raw LPC data for specific words, with resulting higher speech quality.

LPC (linear predictive coding) is the speech synthesis technology used, which allowed applications to encode speech data in a compact form. The Echo II uses the TMS 5220 LPC Speech Chip which was popular in other speech synthesizers.
