= Rich Templeton =

American tech businessman

- Born: 1958
- Education: Union College (BSc 1980)
- Occupations: Former Chairman and CEO of Texas Instruments
- Spouse: Mary Claire Haanen (m. 1987)

Richard Kevin Templeton (born 1958) is an American electrical engineer and business executive. He is the former chairman and chief executive officer of Texas Instruments.

== Education ==
Templeton attended Union College in Schenectady, New York from which he graduated in 1980 with a BSc in electrical engineering.

== Career ==
After graduation, Templeton immediately joined Texas Instruments (TI) where he held a variety of positions. In 1996, he began leading TI's semiconductor business, then served as COO, from April 2000 to April 2004. In May 2004, Templeton was named CEO and, in April 2008, succeeded future JC Penney chairman Tom Engibous as chairman of the Texas instruments board. Templeton is credited by the company with helping define and implement a strategy that is focused on semiconductors for signal processing.

While CEO of Texas Instruments in 2008, Templeton earned a total compensation of $9,623,590, which included a base salary of $960,780, a cash bonus of $1,564,853, stocks granted of $4,468,500, and options granted of $2,397,600.

Templeton led TI's United Way campaign and has also chaired the Metropolitan Dallas United Way campaign.

In 2012, he received the Robert N. Noyce Award from SIA for contributions to technology or public policy.

During a 2015 speaker series at the University of Texas at Austin McCombs School of Business, Templeton discussed his workplace mandate to create an environment where employees feel engaged in work, and participate in community projects, including local STEM programs funded by TI.

In 2018, Templeton resigned as CEO, though soon resumed the role when his successor resigned, remaining chair throughout the transitions. His annual base salary from 2017 of $1.19 million was then increased to $1.25 million, with stock options unchanged from the previous year, noted as $11 million in equity compensation, while he owned 333,615 shares of stock and 609,392 in restricted stock units.

In 2019, Templeton was ranked 49th by Forbes Magazine among "America's Most Innovative Leaders".

In January 2023, Texas Instruments announced Templeton will step down on April 1, to be replaced by its chief operating officer Haviv Ilan. Templeton will remain as chairman of the board. Under his leadership since May 2004, Texas Instruments stock grew 581%, outperforming the VanEck Semiconductor ETF Index, which has risen 549%.

In 2025, Templeton retired as Board Chairman of Texas Instruments Inc.

== Boards and affiliations ==
Templeton is a member of the Business Roundtable, and serves on the board of directors of the Semiconductor Industry Association (SIA). He is a trustee of Southern Methodist University and of the Southwestern Medical Foundation.

== Personal life ==
Templeton married Mary Haanen, whom he met while both were students at Union College; they live in Parker, Texas with their three children. The family is also affiliated with John Paul II High School in Plano, Ursuline Academy of Dallas, Trinity University in San Antonio and Southern Methodist University in Dallas.

In 2020, the Templetons donated $51 million to their alma mater, its largest gift in the 225-year history of Union College, to create the Templeton Institute for Engineering and Computer Science, to help promote science, technology, engineering and mathematics (STEM) education, and to recruit women to engineering and computer science degree programs.
