= Electronic voice alert =

Talking car system of the 1980s

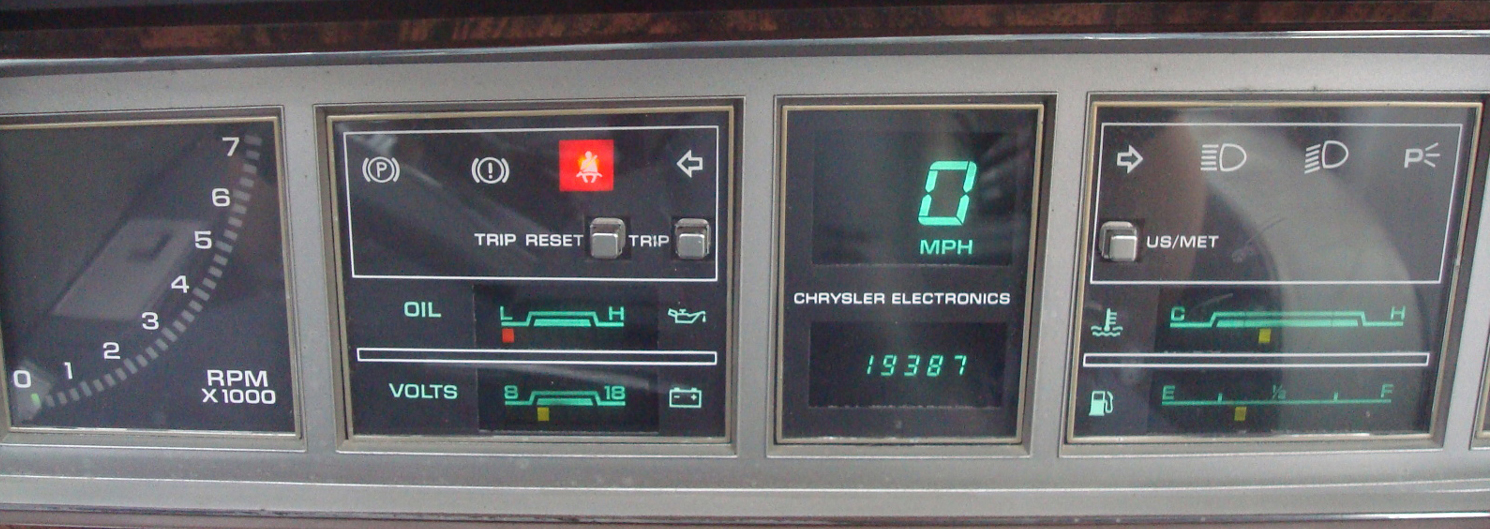
Digital instrument cluster from a 1984 Dodge 600.

Electronic voice alert (EVA) was an option available on many Chrysler K-car-based vehicles in the mid-1980s.

Chrysler and Dodge used technology of the Texas Instruments LPC Speech Chips, that were also used in the Speak & Spell toy. The EVA would automatically lower the radio volume and deliver eleven different spoken warning messages to drivers using a speech synthesizer in 24 certain models.

A similar system was used in 1984 to 1986 Nissan 300ZX, Nissan 200SX, and the Nissan Maxima GL and GLE models. The messages are played from a miniature phonograph record, similar as used in speaking dolls.

The EVA was available on the Chrysler LeBaron (and the optional Mark Cross Edition), Chrysler Town and Country Wagon, Chrysler Fifth Avenue, Chrysler New Yorker, Chrysler Laser, Dodge Daytona, and Dodge 600 between 1983 and 1988. Models sold in Canada accommodated both English and French. Models sold in Mexico spoke Spanish.

Generally paired with a digital instrument cluster and considered the height of technology at the time, many drivers grew weary of the system constantly admonishing them to fasten their seatbelts and turned it off via removing a fuse, which sometimes deactivates the fuel gauge. Later models had the option to be turned off via a switch in the glovebox.
