= Patrick E. Haggerty =

American engineer and businessman

Patrick Eugene Haggerty
- Born: March 17, 1914; Harvey, North Dakota, US
- Died: October 1, 1980 (aged 66); Dallas, Texas, US
- Education: Marquette University (BS)
- Spouse: Beatrice
- Children: 5
- Awards: IEEE Founders Medal (1968); IRI Medal (1969); John Fritz Medal (1971)
- Scientific career
- Workplaces: Geophysical Service Inc., Texas Instruments

Patrick Eugene Haggerty (March 17, 1914 – October 1, 1980) was an American engineer and businessman. He was a co-founder and former president and chairman of Texas Instruments, Incorporated (TI). Under his leadership, the company grew from a small Texas oil exploration company into a global leader in the semiconductor industry. During his tenure, TI invested in transistors when their commercial value was still much in question, created the first silicon transistor, the first commercial transistor radio, the first integrated circuit, and helped develop and produce the first single chip microprocessor.

== Early life ==
On March 17, 1914, Haggerty was born in Harvey, North Dakota, the son of Michael Eugene and Lillian (Evenson) Haggerty. In 1936, he graduated summa cum laude with a Bachelors of Science in electrical engineering from Marquette University.

While in school, Haggerty held a part-time position with the Badger Carton Company in Milwaukee, and upon graduation became production manager. He married Beatrice E. Menne on February 26, 1938. In 1942, he served as a reserve officer in the U. S. Navy's Bureau of Aeronautics, where he attained the rank of Lieutenant. Near the end of the war, he was head of the Bureau's Electronics Production branch, which supervised the production of all airborne electronic equipment.

== Career ==
After his military service, where he met Erik Jonsson, a long serving officer of Geophysical Service Inc., he moved to Dallas in November 1945 and assumed a leadership role in the company as general manager of the newly formed Laboratory and Manufacturing Division. Since its inception in 1930, GSI had advanced the use of and furthered the technological development of the reflection seismograph in petroleum exploration. By 1945, Geophysical Service Inc. had produced a diverse array of manufactured items including anti-submarine detection devices, and a full line of equipment designed for oilfield exploration. The company also provided crews to perform petroleum exploration and consulting.

His ideas and leadership helped transform the L&M division into one of the world’s leading technology developers. In December 1951, GSI became Texas Instruments Incorporated, with Haggerty serving as executive vice president and director. In 1958, he served as president, and in 1966 he was named as chairman, serving in this post until his retirement. Important technological developments undertaken by TI during Haggerty's tenure included laser guided technologies for military applications, airborne radar, and night vision technology that utilized infrared. He also oversaw the development of thermal print heads for printers and in 1967 the company's production of hand-held calculators. Perhaps the single greatest invention of his era was TI's development and production of the single chip micro-processor around 1971. In the realm of geophysics, his tenure oversaw the company's efforts to advance the role of information technology in interpreting and recording seismographic data.

=== Professional associations ===
Haggerty was active in the Institute of Radio Engineers (IRE), serving as its president in 1962. He was co-chair of the committee that merged the (IRE) and the American Institute of Electrical Engineers (AIEE) into the present Institute of Electrical and Electronics Engineers (IEEE). Haggerty was a Fellow of the IEEE. In 1968, he was awarded the IEEE Founders Medal "For outstanding contributions to the leadership of the electrical and electronics engineering profession, with special reference to the development of the worldwide semiconductor industry and service to the profession through his contributions leading to the creation of the IEEE.". In 1969, he was the IRI Medal recipient, awarded by the Industrial Research Institute.

== Legacy ==
Haggerty died at 66 in Dallas on October 1, 1980, after a brief illness at Presbyterian Hospital and was buried in Calvary Hill Cemetery. He had been a member of Texas Instrument's executive board since the company's inception in 1951.

=== Philanthropy ===
Haggerty and his wife left part of their estate to found the Patrick and Beatrice Haggerty Museum of Art at Marquette University. Near the end of his life, Haggerty chaired the board of trustees of Rockefeller University and served as a trustee and leader for the academic growth and development of the University of Dallas. Haggerty had also served as Director of A. H. Belo Corporation, publisher of the Dallas Morning News.
