= Speak & Spell (toy) =

Electronic toy made by Texas Instruments

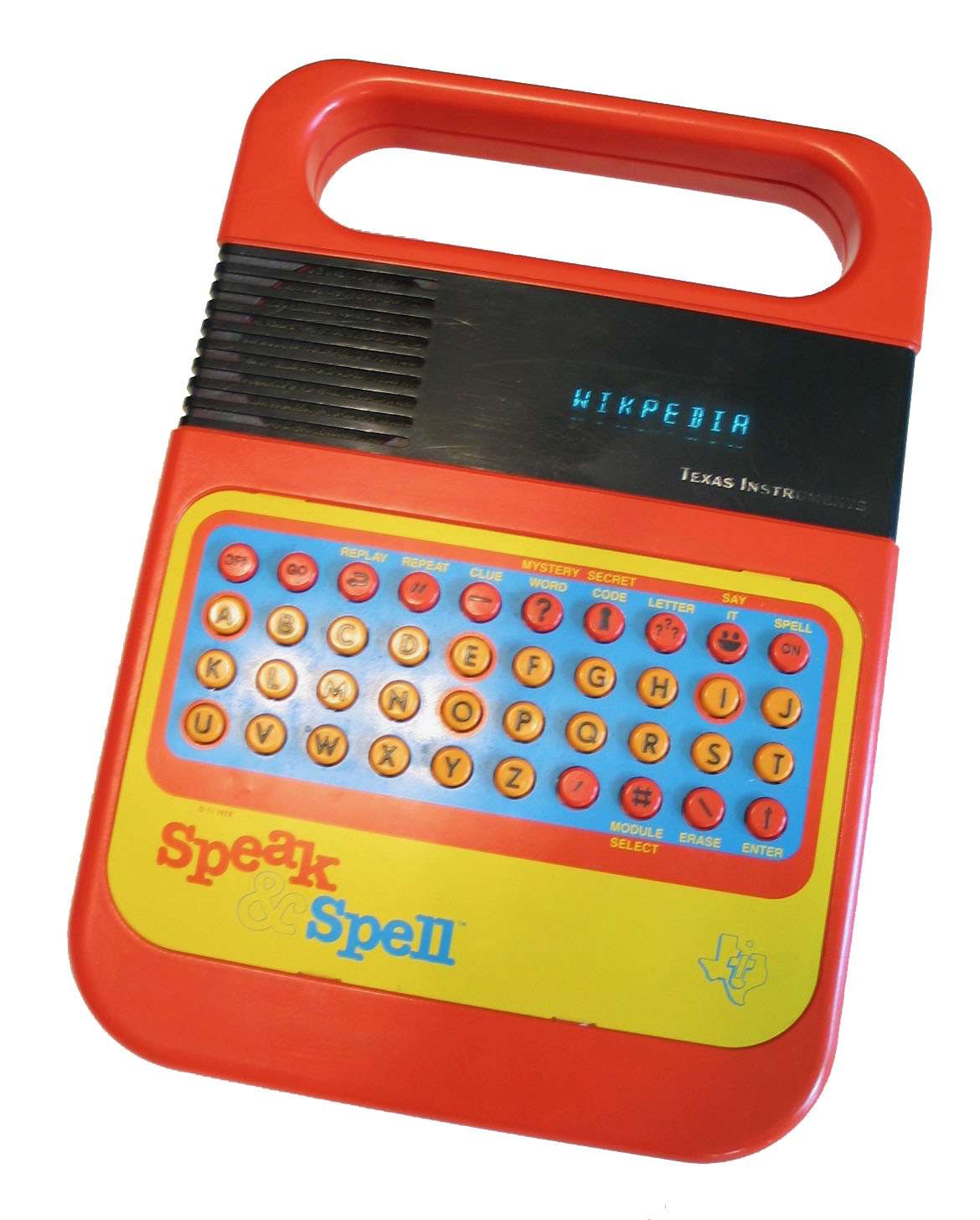
- An American 1979-model Speak & Spell with chiclet keyboard
- Type: Electronic handheld
- Company: Texas Instruments, Basic Fun
- Availability: 1978–1992, 2019–present
- Materials: Plastic

The Speak & Spell line is a series of electronic hand-held child computers by Texas Instruments that consisted of a TMC0280 linear predictive coding speech synthesizer, a keyboard, and a receptor slot to receive one of a collection of ROM game library modules. The first Speak & Spell was introduced at the summer Consumer Electronics Show in 1978, making it one of the earliest handheld electronic devices with a visual display to use interchangeable game cartridges. The company Basic Fun brought back a variant of the second-gen classic Speak & Spell in 2019 with a newly recorded voice and other minor changes.

The Speak & Spell was named an IEEE Milestone in 2009.

== Background ==
The Speak & Spell was created by a small team of engineers, led by Paul Breedlove, with Texas Instruments (TI) during the late 1970s. Development began in 1976 with an initial budget of $25,000 as an outgrowth of TI's research into speech synthesis. The completed proof version of the first console utilized TI's trademarked Solid State Speech technology to store full words in a solid state format similar to the manner in which calculators of the time stored numbers. Additional purchased cartridges (called expansion modules) could be inserted through the battery receptacle to provide new solid-state libraries and new games. This represented the first time an educational toy utilized speech that was not recorded on tape or phonograph record (as with Mattel's See 'n Say line or the earlier Chatty Cathy dolls).

== The Speak & Spell console ==
The original Speak & Spell was the first of a three-part talking educational toy series that also included Speak & Read and Speak & Math. This series was a subset of TI's Learning Center product group and the Speak & Spell was released simultaneously with the Spelling B (a non-speech product designed to help children learn to spell), and the First Watch (designed to teach children to read digital and analog timepieces). The Speak & Spell was sold, with regional variations, in the United States, the United Kingdom, and Japan. The voice in the toy was provided by Mitch Carr, a radio anchor at KRLD.

The toy was originally advertised as a tool for helping children ages 7 and up to learn to spell and pronounce over 200 commonly misspelled words. It shipped without a cartridge as the configuration called the Basic Unit (containing the minigames Mystery Word, Secret Code, and Letter).

=== Later Speak & Spell models ===
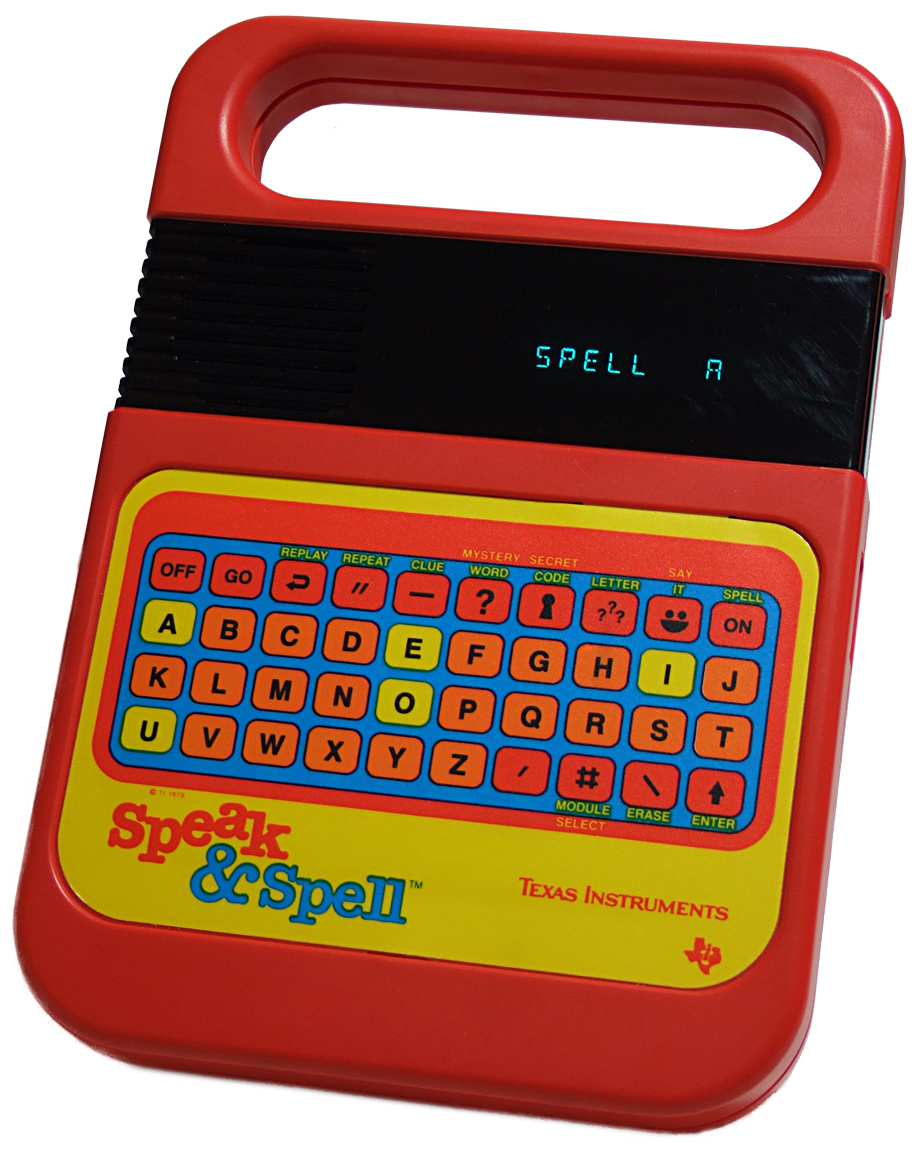
Redesigned Speak & Spell with flat "touch sensitive" membrane keyboard

Between its release and 1983, the Speak & Spell was redesigned twice under the name Speak & Spell. It was completely recreated in 1982 as the Speak & Spell Compact (a version lacking a visual display). In 1989 the Super Speak & Spell was released to replace the original vacuum fluorescent display (VFD) with a liquid crystal display (LCD).

Between 1989 and 1992, the Super Speak & Spell saw three redesigns as well. The 1992 Super Speak & Spell marked the last release of the series.

Regional variations with different speech libraries and different games were released in at least nine countries with seven language variations. Because the linguistic aspect of the games played on the Speak & Spell is of central importance to Speak & Spell titles, separate cartridge libraries were developed for English (including American and British), Japanese, German, French, Italian, and Spanish markets. Beyond the natural disinclination of consumers to purchase games in foreign languages, however, regional lockout does not prevent the use of expansion module cartridges in consoles for which they were not designed. Since the layout of foreign editions is nearly identical (the only major differences being graphics, color, and placement of power/headset jacks), and the cartridges lacked a lockout, cartridges often bore instructions in multiple languages despite their designation for consumer groups that might not understand the language.

In 1980, the original Speak & Spell was redesigned to give it a membrane keyboard in place of raised buttons. This version was nearly identical to the first release and with backward compatible cartridge recognition common to all Speak & Spells except the first version of the Super Speak & Spell, the entire library of cartridges from the original release was available to the 1980 release. Outside of the United States, the 1980 release was marketed in the United Kingdom under the same name, in German as the Buddy (employing an umlaut in place of the Speak & Spell's apostrophe), and in French as La Dictée Magique ("The Magical Dictation").

In 1982, the Speak & Spell Compact was released at about half the size of the Speak & Spell and lacking the VFD screen. The Speak & Spell Compact was a dedicated console and only one other version, the Speak & Write, was released for English markets.

In 1983, the Speak & Spell was again redesigned. The change was even more minute, however, representing nothing more substantial than a redesign of the faceplate graphics. This version was marketed first in Italian as Grillo Parlante ("The Talking Cricket" as the character of the book for children The Adventures of Pinocchio), and then later in the United States and the United Kingdom as the Speak & Spell, and in France as the Dictée Magique again.

In 1989, the Super Speak & Spell was released with a number of major changes. The display screen was changed to an LCD screen instead of the former VFD screen. The keyboard layout was also altered to match the standard QWERTY keyboard rather than the ABC keyboard. The general structure of the console was also altered so that the handle which had come at the top of the screen in prior Speak & Spells was now found on the bottom of the toy and ergonomic features were added to the shape. Game cartridges for the Super Speak & Spell were changed so that they were incompatible with prior Speak & Spells and the cartridge slot was similarly altered to prevent backward compatibility.

In 1990, the Super Speak & Spell was redesigned to be similar to its prior Speak & Spell form. This version re-adopted the handle-on-top look of the previous models and resumed the use of the original cartridges. The use of the LCD screen and the QWERTY keyboard were retained; however, the keyboard gained an additional 5 letters (6 in some regions) to correspond with letters requiring diacritics. It was marketed first in Spanish as El Loro Parlanchín (The Chatty Parrot), and then later in the United States as the Super Speak & Spell, in French as La Super Dictée Magique, and in Italian as Grillo Parlante Più ("Speaking Cricket Plus").

In 1992, a third redesign of the Super Speak & Spell was made for the Spanish market only. The new version was nearly identical to the prior El Loro Parlanchín save for the name which became El Loro Profesor (Professor Parrot).

=== 2019 Speak & Spell ===
In 2019, Basic Fun acquired rights to manufacture the Speak & Spell. The updated version introduced a number of changes. Primary among these is the replacement of the original microprocessor and classic synthesized voice chip (TMS1000 and TMC0280 respectively) with recorded dialog that is processed to sound as if it is synthesized. It also offers on-device instructions that were not available on previous versions. The 2019 model Speak & Spell also replaces the VFD screen with a segmented LCD screen. The use of removable cartridges has also been eliminated.

== Electronics ==
The Speak & Spell used the first single-chip voice synthesizer, the TMC0280, later known as the TI TMS5100, which utilized a 10th-order linear predictive coding (LPC) model by using pipelined electronic DSP logic. A variant of this chip with a very similar voice was eventually used in certain Chrysler vehicles in the 1980s as the Electronic Voice Alert.

Speech synthesis data (phoneme data) for the spoken words were stored on a pair of 128 Kbit metal gate PMOS ROMs. 128 Kbit was at the time the largest capacity ROM in use. Additional memory module cartridges could be interchangeably plugged into a slot in the battery compartment and selected via a button on the keyboard. The technique used to create the words was to have a professional speaker speak the words. The utterances were captured and processed. Originally all of the recording and processing was completed in Dallas. By 1982 when the British, French, Italian and German versions were being developed, the original voices were recorded in the TI facility near Nice in France and these full bit rate digital recordings were sent to Dallas for processing using a minicomputer. Some weeks later the processed data was returned and required significant hand editing to fix the voicing errors which had occurred during the process. The data rate was so radically cut that all of the words needed some editing. In some cases, this was fairly simple, but some words were unintelligible and required days of work and others had to be completely scrapped. The stored data were for the specific words and phrases used in the Speak & Spell. The data rate was about 1,000 bits per second.

The video display employed in the Speak & Spell was a vacuum fluorescent display (VFD) that was only capable of displaying 8 text characters at a time. The later Super Speak & Spell model had a slimmer case and an LCD screen which could display 16 characters.

The unit could use either 4 "C" batteries or a 6-volt DC power adapter with positive tip polarity.

== Cartridges ==
Cartridges (also known as expansion modules) are freely exchangeable ROM libraries that provide additional content without providing additional functionality. These cartridges are plugged into a slot near the battery compartment in order to introduce new software libraries. Word and game lists are of different lengths depending upon the cartridge and the word lists in models marketed for different languages reflect the language marketed for. Separate word lists also exist for regional variants such as the American and British English versions. The word list used in each of the regional models reflects the recommendations of educators in each country. The English, French, German and Italian versions were all created by a team of non-specialists, in TI's plant near Antibes, France, under the watchful eye of Larry Brantingham who had patented the underlying technology.

List of cartridges for the Speak & Spell line
Console	Module title	Date	Color
Speak & Spell (1978)	Basic Unit (not a cartridge)	1978	N/A
Speak & Spell (1978)	Vowel Power	1978	Red
Speak & Spell (1978)	Super Stumpers 4–6	1979	Red
Speak & Spell (1978)	Super Stumpers 7–8	1979	Red
Speak & Spell (1978)	Basic Builders	1979	Red
Speak & Spell (1978)	Mighty Verbs	1979	Red
Speak & Spell (1978, UK)	Vowel Power	1978	Red
Speak & Spell (1978, UK)	Mighty Verbs	1979	Red
Speak & Spell (1980)	Homonym Heroes	1980	Red
Speak & Spell (1980)	Noun Endings	1980	Red
Speak & Spell (1980)	Magnificent Modifiers	1980	Red
Speak & Spell (1980)	Vowel Ventures	1980	Red
Speak & Spell (1980)	E.T. Fantasy Module	1982	Red
La Dictée Magique	Les Mots De Base Module No 1		Red
La Dictée Magique	Les Mots Difficiles Module No 2		Red
La Dictée Magique	Les Animaux Familiers		Red
La Dictée Magique	Les Magasins De La Rue Module No 4		Red
La Dictée Magique	Les Extra-Terrestres Module No 5		Red
Grillo Parlante	SuperModulo		Red
Super Speak & Spell	Words, Words, Words		Yellow
Super Speak & Spell	Words Around Us		Gray
Super Speak & Spell	Expansion 3		Blue
El Loro Parlanchín	Módulo de Extensión No 1	1990	Blue
La Super Dictée Magique	Module d'Extension Anglais 1	1991	Blue
La Super Dictée Magique	Module d'Extension No 2	1991	Blue

Examples of educational games that could be played using Speak & Spell cartridges include:

- Say It – A word-spelling game where the player must spell ten words after hearing them "spoken" by the unit. The E.T. Fantasy Module tie-in (based on the toy's appearance in the movie E.T. the Extra-Terrestrial) asked players to spell such words as "geranium", "universe", and "creature".
- Mystery Word – An electronic version of hangman
- Secret Code – A code-generating program in which the player enters a word on the Speak & Spell and the console returns the word in code.
- Letter – Another algorithm that allows the player to change a word that has been entered by shifting its letters several spaces down the alphabet.
- Drop It – A Super Speak & Spell game in which the player will see how new words are made by adding prefixes and suffixes.
- Memory – A Super Speak & Spell game in which letter recognition and visual memory skills are tested.
- Mystery – A Super Speak & Spell game in which letter patterns in words and visual memory are developed.
- Mix Up – A Super Speak & Spell game in which word patterns and the relationships between letter sounds and spelling are tested.
- Same As – A Super Speak & Spell game in which homophones are tested.
- A.C.E. – A Super Speak & Spell game in which abbreviations, contractions, and word endings are tested.
- Race – A Super Speak & Spell game in which fast recall, accurate spelling, and touch-typing skills are tested with time limits.

The "Secret Code" mini-game encrypted or decrypted "words" (really, any string of up to 8 letters) by matching up two sets of the alphabet, slightly askew, in the form of a Caesar cipher. In the game, both C and D and P and Q match up and run in opposite directions:

A B C D E F G H I J K L M N O P Q R S T U V W X Y Z
F E D C B A Z Y X W V U T S R Q P O N M L K J I H G

== Home computer adaptations ==
Several commercial retailers offered hardware and software that allowed home computers to interface with the Speak & Spell's hardware and access its capabilities, and Larry Dighera was the first to reveal how that might be accomplished.

Percom Data Company offered a PC Card named "Speak-2-Me-2" which was installed into the battery compartment of the Speak & Spell and connected via cable to a TRS-80.

East Coast Micro Products offered hardware to interface 6502-based computers such as the Commodore 64 and Apple IIe with the Speak & Spell. A program called "S.peek.uP" was marketed which could control this hardware.

The February 1983 issue of Computers & Electronics contained instructions for interfacing a Speak & Spell with a Sinclair ZX-80 a Sinclair ZX-81, or a Timex 1000.

Texas Instruments itself later adapted the Speak & Spell's technology into a speech synthesizer accessory for its popular TI-99/4A computer.

=== Emulation ===
The Speak & Spell (as well as the "Speak & Math" and "Speak & Read") are emulated, running the original code, by MESS.

A number of simulations of the Speak & Spell (not emulations, as they don't run the original code) have shown up online in recent years with varying degrees of functionality. Often programmed for Flash, these are often the result of nostalgic sentiment for the 1980s.

Examples of simulators generally available online include:

- SASS – A fully functional non-Flash executable simulator created by Mike Green in 1999
- Speak & Spell Online – a Flash-based web application with partial functionality created by Jake Smith in 2002
- Speak & Spell Emulator – a Flash-based web application with full functionality created by Kevin St.Onge in 2006
- Speak & Spell JS – a JavaScript-based web application with partial functionality created by Shannon Carey in 2008

== Legacy ==
=== In commercial music ===
A modified Speak & Spell is featured on the Hexstatic album Listen & Learn.

The Speak & Spell has been employed in recent years in commercial music as an instrument either in its original form or as a modified "bent" circuit instrument (see below). Artists like Kraftwerk have used the musical samples from the Speak & Spell's opening sequence in their songs, whereas most employed the non-musical vocal portions of the Speak & Spell to create vocal parts in their songs. Speak & Spell speech synthesis has featured in genres such as alternative rock (e.g. Beck, Limp Bizkit), electronic music (e.g. Jean Michel Jarre, Röyksopp, and Robyn), synthpop (e.g. Orchestral Manoeuvres in the Dark, Plastics, Erasure, and Freezepop), trance music (e.g. Sōta Fujimori), electropop (e.g. TLC), Christian rock (e.g. Resurrection Band, Family Force 5), pop (e.g. Cheetah Girls), and hip-hop (e.g. Naya Rivera).

The English synthpop band Depeche Mode's 1981 debut album, Speak & Spell, is named after it.

=== Circuit bending ===
Some musicians have also used modified "circuit bent" (where electronic circuits are customised to create new effects) Speak & Spell units in their compositions. By opening the Speak & Spell's case, cross-wiring terminals, and installing electronic components such as switches and potentiometers, amateur hobbyists purposely disrupt the normal functioning of the Speak & Spell's membrane keyboard matrix circuit to create new sounds. These modifications act to overwhelm the unit's keyboard switch matrix to produce an effect known in the field of electronics as key jamming or ghosting. This effect can be triggered in the Speak & Spell without making modifications if more than 3 keys in the same row are depressed simultaneously; however, within the circuit bending culture, emphasis is given to the fact that these units are being used as instruments and thus externally manipulable components are often accentuated. Great attention may be given to enhancing the visual aesthetics of the units by adding decorations and repainting "bent" Speak & Spells, and these units have been traded and sold online and within the circuit bender community.

Examples of artists who have used circuit-bent Speak & Spells in their compositions include Beck, CocoRosie, Eisbrecher, Experimental Audio Research, Fantômas, Scrabbel, Venetian Snares, and Claude Woodward The Sonic Manipulator.

=== In popular culture ===
The Speak & Spell features in various electronics museums such as the Computer History Museum and the Smithsonian National Museum of American History due to its seminal influence in the field of modern speech synthesis. The Speak & Spell is also featured in the Game On exhibition as an example of a handheld video game.

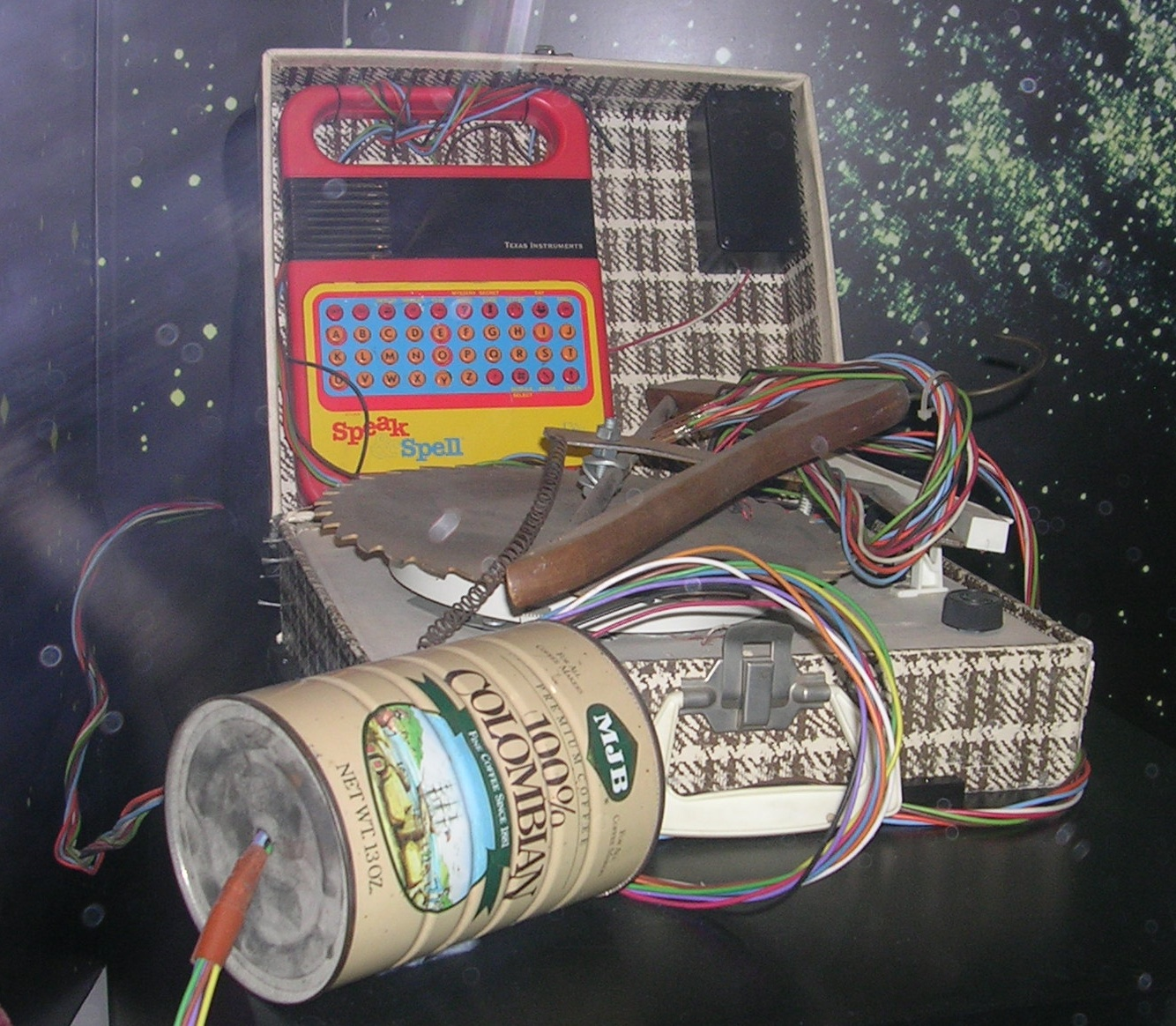
A 1978-model Speak & Spell features prominently as the "phone home" in 1982's E.T. the Extra-Terrestrial (note the raised buttons).

The Speak & Spell has shown up in various television shows, films, and game shows. A Speak & Spell has a prominent role as a key component of the alien creature's homebuilt interstellar communicator in Steven Spielberg's 1982 film E.T. the Extra-Terrestrial. Speak & Spells also make appearances in movies such as Pixar's Toy Story and Toy Story 2 (where the game device is a character named "Mr. Spell"), Bride of Chucky (where the possessed doll, Chucky plays with one), in Poltergeist III (used by the character Carol Anne Freeling), and in the music videos for the songs "Playgirl" by the synthpop music group Ladytron, "Fireflies" by Owl City and "Dare" by Gorillaz. The Speak and Spell voice also appears in the video games Deltarune and TxK.

== Variants ==
=== Speak & Read line ===
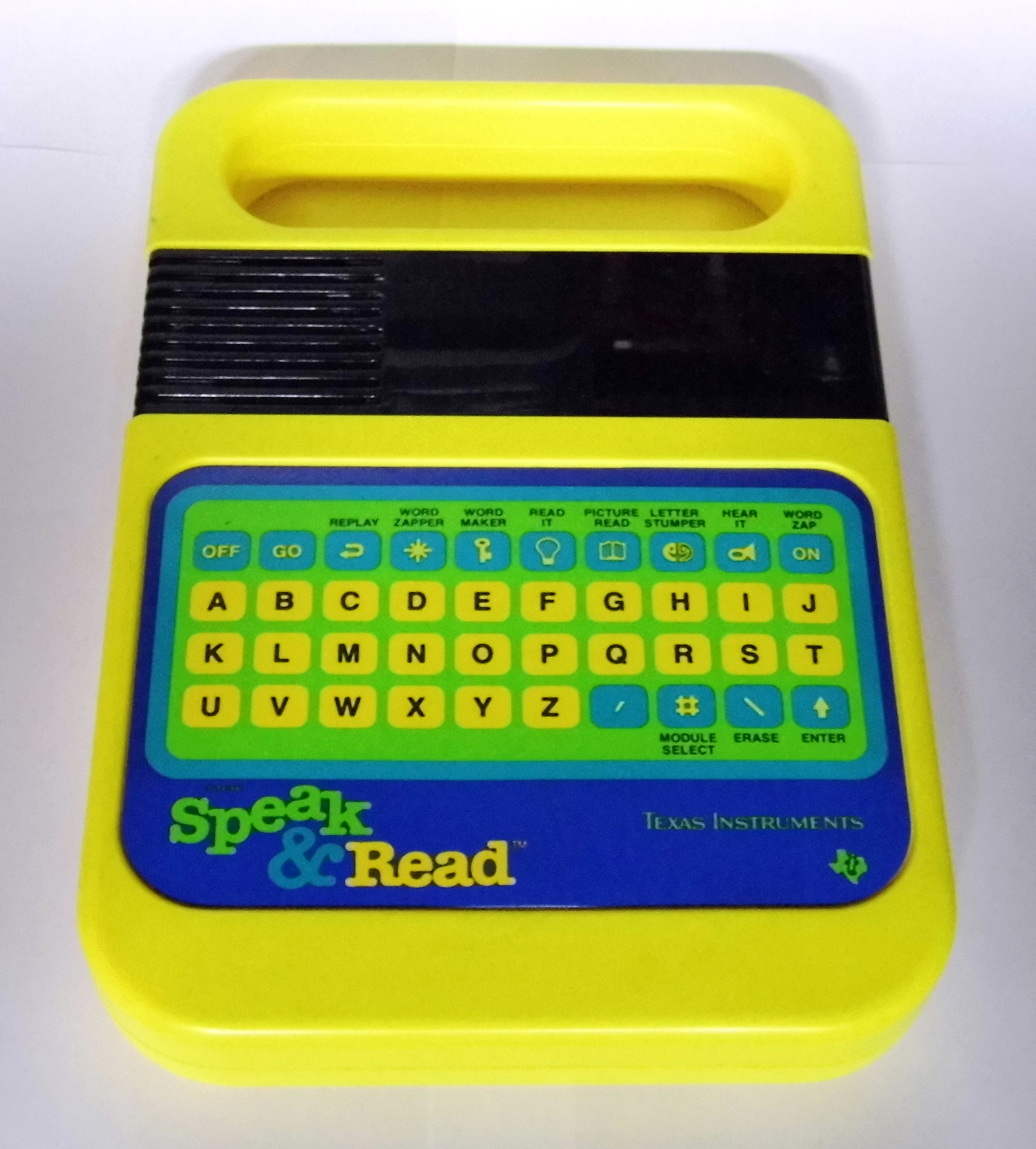
Speak & Read

The Speak & Read was released in 1980 with a shape identical to the Speak & Spell but with different game features and a different color scheme. Where the American Speak & Spell had been colored red with yellow and orange accents, the American Speak & Read was yellow with blue and green accents. Game cartridges for the Speak & Read were identical in shape to those of the main Speak & Spell line, and they could be physically inserted into units from the wrong line; however, they did not function except in members of their own line. The Speak & Read was designed to focus on reading comprehension in children of ages 4–8 with a library of over 250 basic words.

The Speak & Read was very minutely redesigned in 1986, under the same name, with the new version representing nothing more substantial than a redesign of the faceplate graphics. In 1988 the Super Speak & Read was released as a major redesign to feature a suitcase-like flip-open appearance. Cartridges were redesigned to be thinner and of a different shape, bearing some resemblance to the cartridges of TI's Touch & Discover line. Additionally, the keyboard was removed completely and a matrix of membrane buttons took its place similar to the position-sensitive "keyboard" of the Touch & Discover consoles. Each cartridge came with a work-booklet that was laid out in an open position in the center of the Super Speak & Read. As questions were asked, the player pressed the appropriate portion of the work-booklet to depress the membrane button beneath. This was the last member of the Speak & Read line under this name; however, the Ready... Set... Read! (sharing a highly similar design layout) and later Magic Reading Desk (featuring a modified Ready... Set... Read! layout) are considered the Speak & Read's spiritual successors. Both Ready... Set... Read! and Magic Reading Desk cartridges are identical in design to the Super Speak & Read's cartridges.

=== Speak & Math line ===
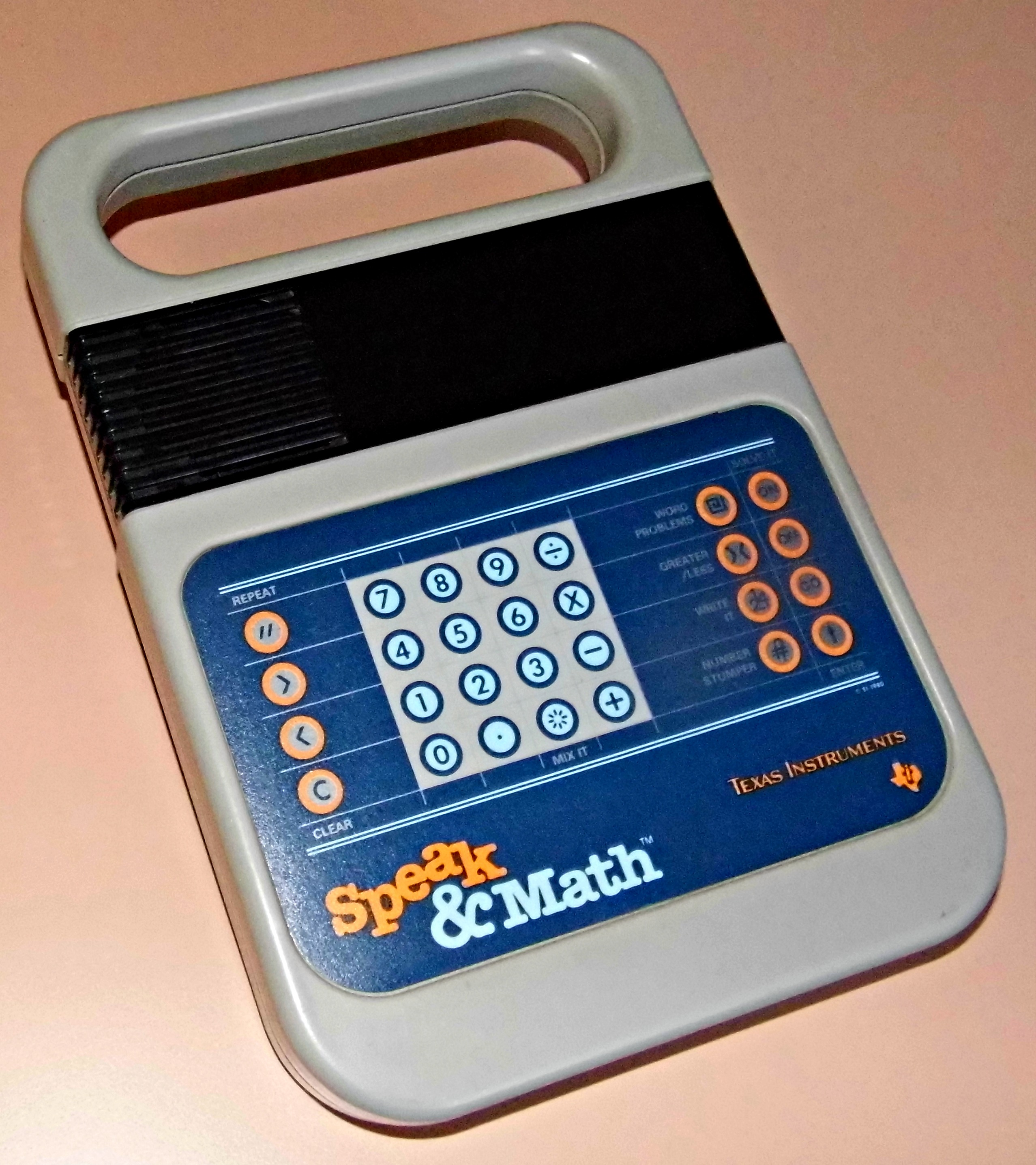
Speak & Math

The Speak & Math (sold as "Speak & Maths" in some countries) was released in 1980 with a shape identical to both the Speak & Spell and the Speak & Read but with a completely different keyboard layout, different game features, and a different color scheme. Where the American Speak & Spell had been colored red with yellow and orange accents, the American Speak & Math was gray with blue and orange highlights. The Speak & Math was designed to focus on mathematics in children aged 6–12 with a library of over 100,000 random and preprogrammed problems. It was regarded as the spiritual successor to TI's earlier DataMan series, with the difference mainly relating to the addition of speech synthesizing software and the visual display. The Speak & Math was only released to the American and British markets.

In 1982, a compact version of the Speak & Math was developed contemporaneously with the Speak & Spell Compact. This version was only released in France as Les Maths Magique (lit. The Magical Math). A redesigned version was developed in 1985 for British markets under the name of Maths marvel. This was later released in Italian as Dotto Conta-Parla, in French as le Calcul magique (lit. Magical Calculator), and in German as Mathe-Fix.

The Speak & Math was very minutely redesigned in 1986, under the same name, with the new version representing nothing more substantial than a redesign of the faceplate graphics. In 1990 the Super Speak & Math was released as a major redesign similar to the first version of the Super Speak & Spell. As with the Super Speak & Spell, the display screen of the Super Speak & Math was changed to an LCD screen instead of the former VFD screen. The keyboard was also expanded and given more functions. The general structure of the console was also altered similarly to the Super Speak & Spell such that the handle which had come at the top of the screen in prior Speak & Math units was now found on the bottom of the toy and ergonomic features were added to the shape.

=== Other Solid State Speech products ===
Texas Instruments' Solid State Speech technology found its way into a number of other titles also related to the Speak & Spell line. Examples include:

- Speak & Learn Magic Wand – A work-booklet-based electronic game featuring the use of infra-red barcode reader technology.
- Speak & Music – A musical audio game allowing free-form and memory-based (rhythm memory, eidetic musical memory, etc.) gameplay.
- Ready... Set... Read! – Considered the spiritual successor to the Speak & Read line.
- Magic Reading Desk – Considered the spiritual successor to the Ready... Set... Read! and Speak & Read lines.
- Little Maestro – A musical audio game aimed at younger children than the Speak & Music.

=== Other games ===
A number of TI's other game lines produced during the period when it was producing Speak & Spell games bore similar logically conjunctive titles and employed similar technology although they did not involve the use of Solid State Speech technology. Such games included:

- Touch & Tell – A 1978 educational game aimed at children of ages 2 to 5 employing a position-sensitive keyboard. A synthesized voice asked children questions and kids touched the answers on the keyboard.
  - Teddy Touch & Tell – The next generation of the Touch & Tell game, Teddy Touch & Tell is shaped like a bear and educates children on the topics of the alphabet, numbers, colors, animals, and music.
- Touch & Discover – An educational game employing a position-sensitive membrane matrix keyboard. The Touch & Discover is considered the precursor to the Super Speak & Read. Disney licensed their characters to Texas Instruments for this toy, and Touch & Discover employed the "first-ever" synthesized voices of Disney characters.
  - Touch & Discover School Edition – The next generation of the Touch & Discover console, the Touch & Discover School Edition is aimed at a slightly older audience.
- Touch & Talkies – A dedicated handheld series, there were four versions of Touch & Talkies all aimed at very young players.
- Listen & Learn – The first electronic, educational toys to be marketed to infants, the Listen & Learn toys were a series of three themed, electronic toys aimed at children between 6 and 36 months. These toys were dodecahedron (12-sided) ball-shaped and were motion and directionally sensitive. The toy reacted to which side landed on top when rolled and produced a sound corresponding to the picture on top.

== See also ==
- Educational software
- Educational toy
