= Texas Instruments =

American semiconductor designer and manufacturer

Coordinates: 32.9110°N 96.7523°W

Texas Instruments Incorporated

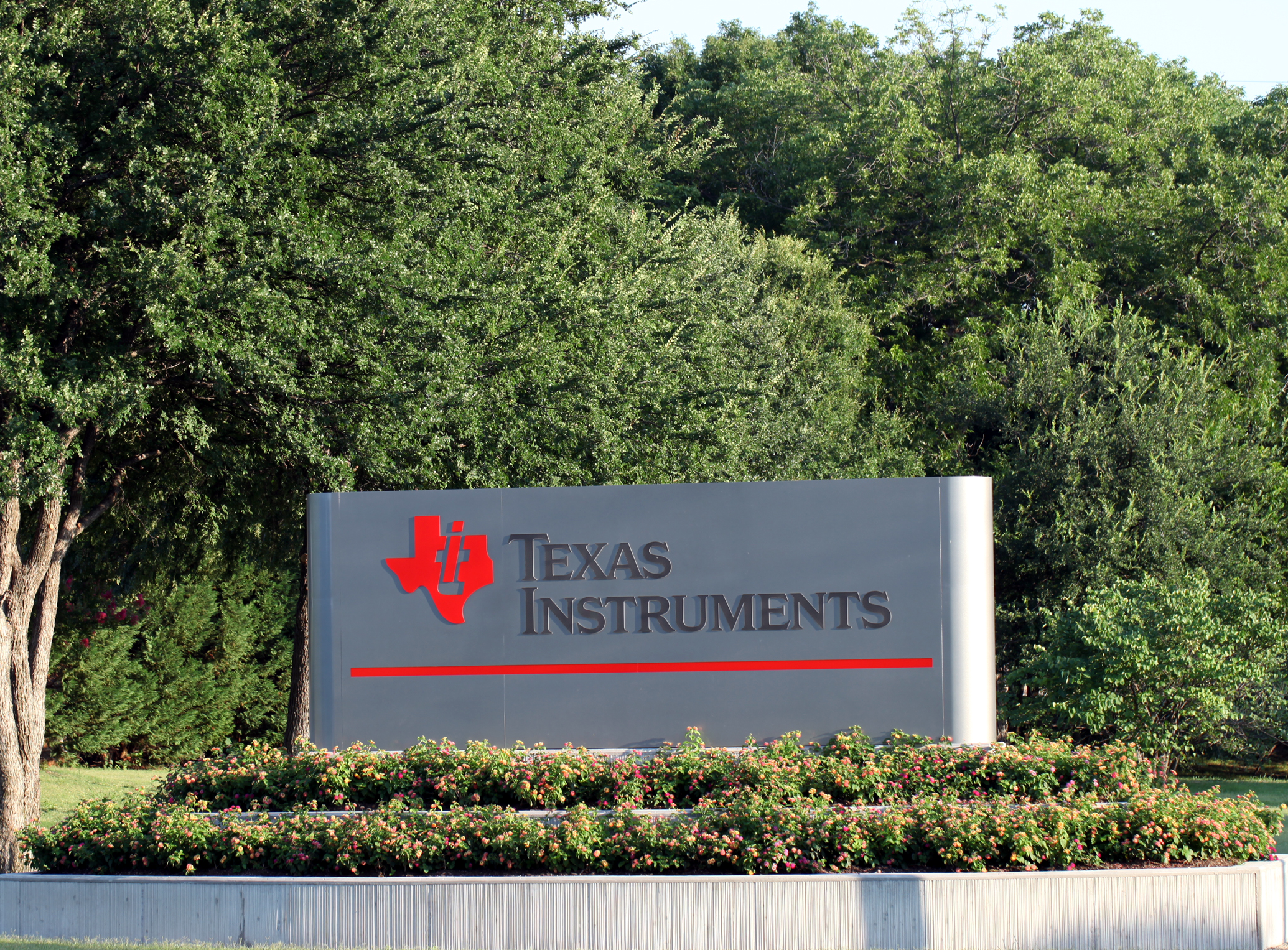
- Sign at TI's Dallas headquarters
- Type: Public
- Traded as: Nasdaq: TXN; Nasdaq-100 component; S&P 100 component; S&P 500 component
- Industry: Semiconductors
- Predecessor: Geophysical Service
- Founded: 1930; 96 years ago (as Geophysical Service Incorporated); 1951; 75 years ago (as Texas Instruments)
- Founders: Cecil H. Green; J. Erik Jonsson; Eugene McDermott; Patrick E. Haggerty
- Headquarters: Dallas, Texas, U.S.
- Key people: Haviv Ilan (chairman, president, CEO); Ahmad Bahai (CTO)
- Products: Analog electronics; Calculators; Digital signal processors; Digital light processors; Integrated circuits; Embedded processors
- Revenue: ▲US$17.7 billion (2025)
- Operating income: ▲US$6.02 billion (2025)
- Net income: ▲US$5.00 billion (2025)
- Total assets: ▼US$34.6 billion (2025)
- Total equity: ▼US$16.3 billion (2025)
- Number of employees: 34,000 (2025)
- Website: ti.com

Texas Instruments Incorporated (TI) is an American multinational semiconductor company headquartered in Dallas, Texas, United States. It was one of the top 10 semiconductor companies worldwide based on sales volume in 2015. The company's focus is on developing analog chips and embedded processors, which account for more than 80% of its revenue. TI also produces digital light processing (DLP) technology and education technology products including calculators, microcontrollers, and multi-core processors.

Texas Instruments emerged in 1951 from the reorganization of Geophysical Service Incorporated, a company founded in 1930 that manufactured equipment for the seismic industry and defense electronics. TI produced the world's first commercial silicon transistor in 1954, and the same year designed and manufactured the first transistor radio. Jack Kilby invented the integrated circuit in 1958 while working at TI's Central Research Labs. TI also invented the handheld calculator in 1967 and introduced the first single-chip microcontroller in 1970, combining all the elements of computing onto a single chip.

In 1987, TI invented the digital light processing device (also known as the DLP chip), which serves as the foundation for the company's DLP technology and DLP Cinema. TI released the popular TI-81 calculator in 1990, which made it a leader in the graphing calculator industry. Its defense business was sold to Raytheon Company in 1997, allowing TI to strengthen its focus on digital solutions. After the acquisition of National Semiconductor in 2011, the company had a combined portfolio of 45,000 analog products and customer design tools.

== History ==
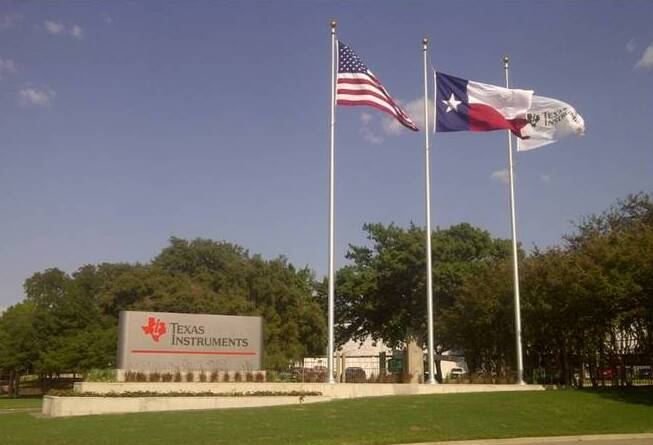
Entrance to Texas Instruments North Campus facility in Dallas, Texas

Texas Instruments was founded by Cecil H. Green, J. Erik Jonsson, Eugene McDermott, and Patrick E. Haggerty in 1951. McDermott was one of the original founders of Geophysical Service Inc. (GSI) in 1930. McDermott, Green, and Jonsson were GSI employees who purchased the company in 1941. In November 1945, Patrick Haggerty was hired as general manager of the Laboratory and Manufacturing (L&M) division, which focused on electronic equipment. By 1951, the L&M division, with its defense contracts, was growing faster than GSI's geophysical division. The company was reorganized and initially renamed General Instruments Inc. Because a firm named General Instrument already existed, the company was renamed Texas Instruments that same year. From 1956 to 1961, Fred Agnich of Dallas, later a Republican member of the Texas House of Representatives, served as president of Texas Instruments. Geophysical Service, Inc. became a subsidiary of Texas Instruments. Early in 1988, most of GSI was sold to the Halliburton Company.

Texas Instruments exists to create, make, and market useful products and services to satisfy the needs of its customers throughout the world.

— Patrick Haggerty, Texas Instruments Statement of Purpose

=== Geophysical Service Incorporated ===
In 1930, J. Clarence Karcher and Eugene McDermott founded Geophysical Service, an early provider of seismic exploration services to the petroleum industry. In 1939, the company reorganized as Coronado Corp, an oil company with Geophysical Service Inc (GSI), now as a subsidiary. On December 6, 1941, McDermott along with three other GSI employees, J. Erik Jonsson, Cecil H. Green, and H. B. Peacock purchased GSI. During World War II, GSI expanded its services to include electronics for the U.S. Army, Army Signal Corps, and U.S. Navy. In 1951, the company changed its name to Texas Instruments, spun off to build seismographs for oil explorations and with GSI becoming a wholly owned subsidiary of the new company.

An early success came for TI-GSI in 1965, when GSI was able (under a Top Secret government contract) to monitor the Soviet Union's underground nuclear weapons testing under the ocean in Vela Uniform, a subset of Project Vela, to verify compliance of the Partial Nuclear Test Ban Treaty.

Texas Instruments also continued to manufacture equipment for use in the seismic industry, and GSI continued to provide seismic services. After selling (and repurchasing) GSI, TI finally sold the company to Halliburton in 1988, after which sale GSI ceased to exist as a separate entity.

=== Semiconductors ===
In early 1952, Texas Instruments purchased a patent license from Western Electric, the manufacturing arm of AT&T, to produce germanium transistors for US$25,000, beginning production by the end of the year. Haggerty brought Gordon Teal to the company due to his expertise in growing semiconductor crystals while at Bell Telephone Laboratories. Teal's first assignment was to direct TI's research laboratory. At the end of 1952, Texas Instruments announced that it had expanded to 2,000 employees and $17 million in sales.

Among his new hires was Willis Adcock, who joined TI early in 1953. Adcock, who like Teal was a physical chemist, began leading a small research group focused on the task of fabricating grown-junction, silicon, single-crystal, small-signal transistors. Adcock later became the first TI Principal Fellow.

==== First silicon transistor and integrated circuits ====
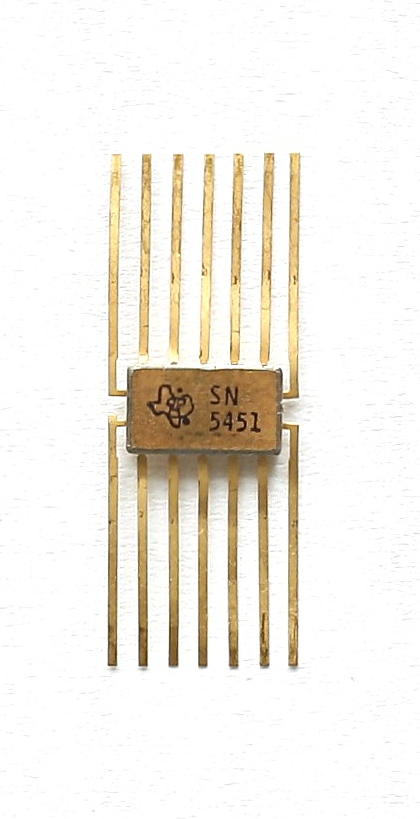
Transistorized "logic" chip, an integrated circuit produced by TI

In January 1954, Morris Tanenbaum at Bell Telephone Laboratories created the first workable silicon transistor. This work was reported in the spring of 1954, at the IRE off-the-record conference on solid-state devices, and was later published in the Journal of Applied Physics. Working independently in April 1954, Gordon Teal at TI created the first commercial silicon transistor and tested it on April 14, 1954. On May 10, 1954, at the Institute of Radio Engineers National Conference on Airborne Electronics in Dayton, Ohio, Teal presented a paper: "Some Recent Developments in Silicon and Germanium Materials and Devices".

In 1954, Texas Instruments designed and manufactured the first transistor radio. The Regency TR-1 used germanium transistors, as silicon transistors were much more expensive at the time. This was an effort by Haggerty to increase market demand for transistors.

Jack Kilby, an employee at TI, invented the integrated circuit in 1958. Kilby recorded his initial ideas concerning the integrated circuit in July 1958 and successfully demonstrated the world's first working integrated circuit on September 12, 1958. Six months later, Robert Noyce of Fairchild Semiconductor (who went on to co-found Intel) independently developed the integrated circuit with integrated interconnect and is also considered an inventor of the integrated circuit. In 1969, Kilby was awarded the National Medal of Science, and in 1982 he was inducted into the National Inventor's Hall of Fame. Kilby also won the 2000 Nobel Prize in Physics for his part of the invention of the integrated circuit. Noyce's chip, made at Fairchild, was made of silicon, while Kilby's chip was made of germanium. In 2008, TI named its new development laboratory "Kilby Labs" after Jack Kilby.

==== Standard TTL ====
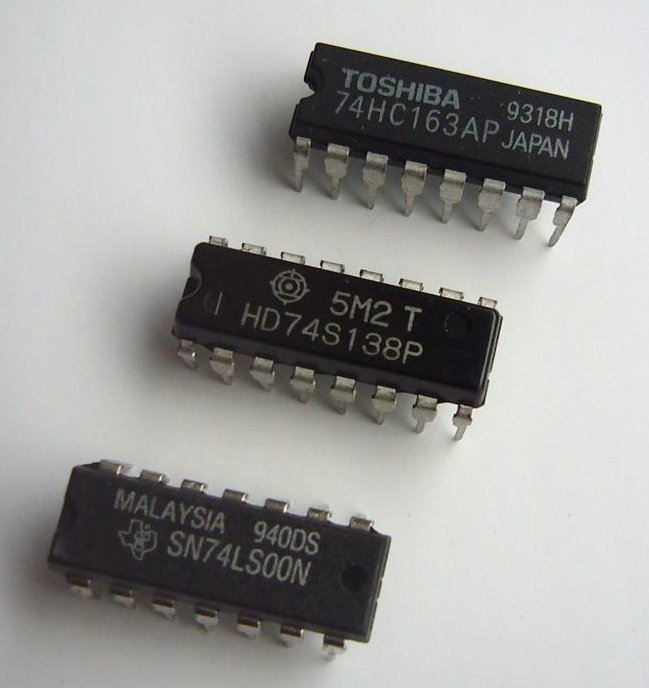
Texas Instruments and other brands of 7400 series TTL and CMOS logic

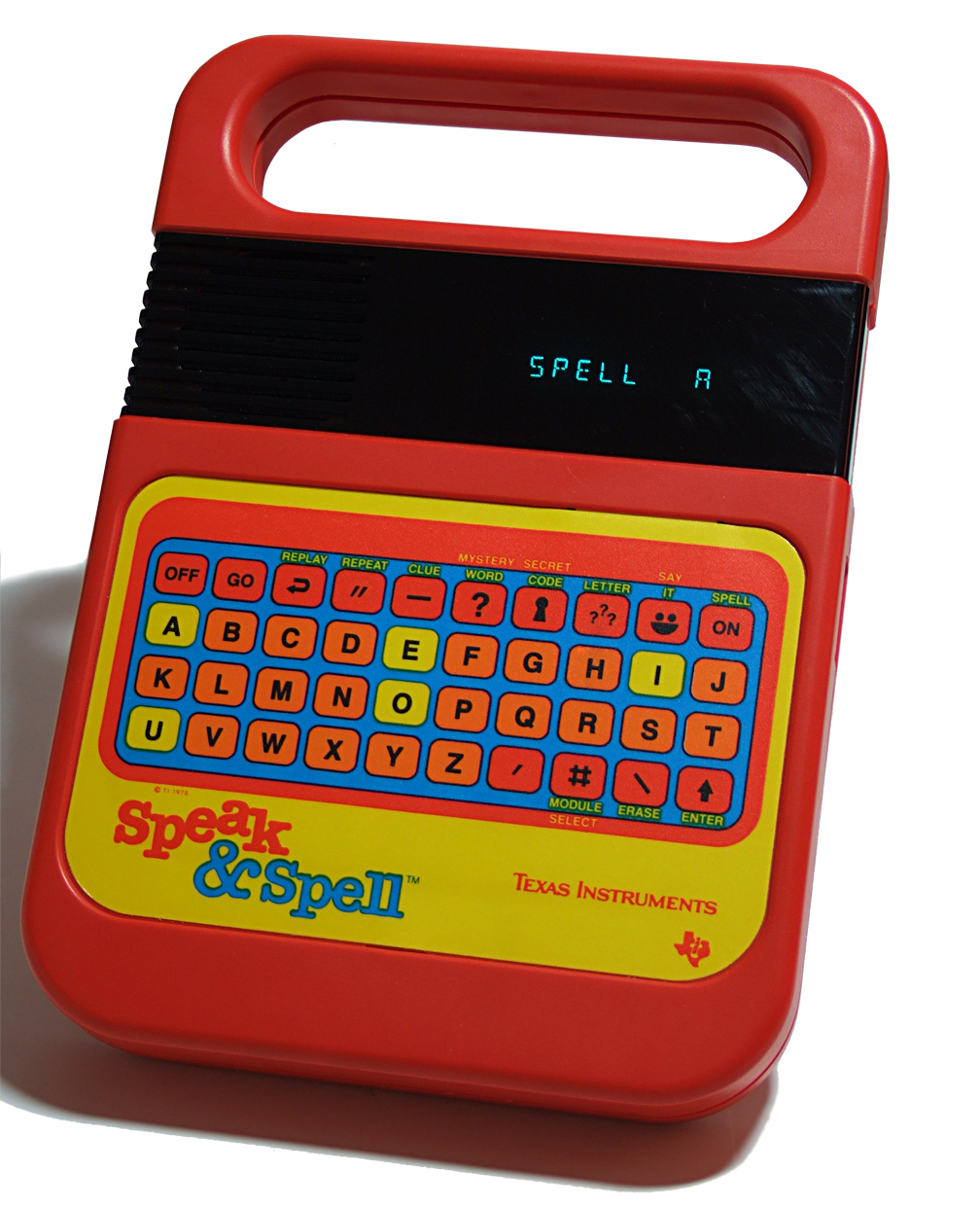
Texas Instruments Speak & Spell using a TMC0280 speech synthesizer

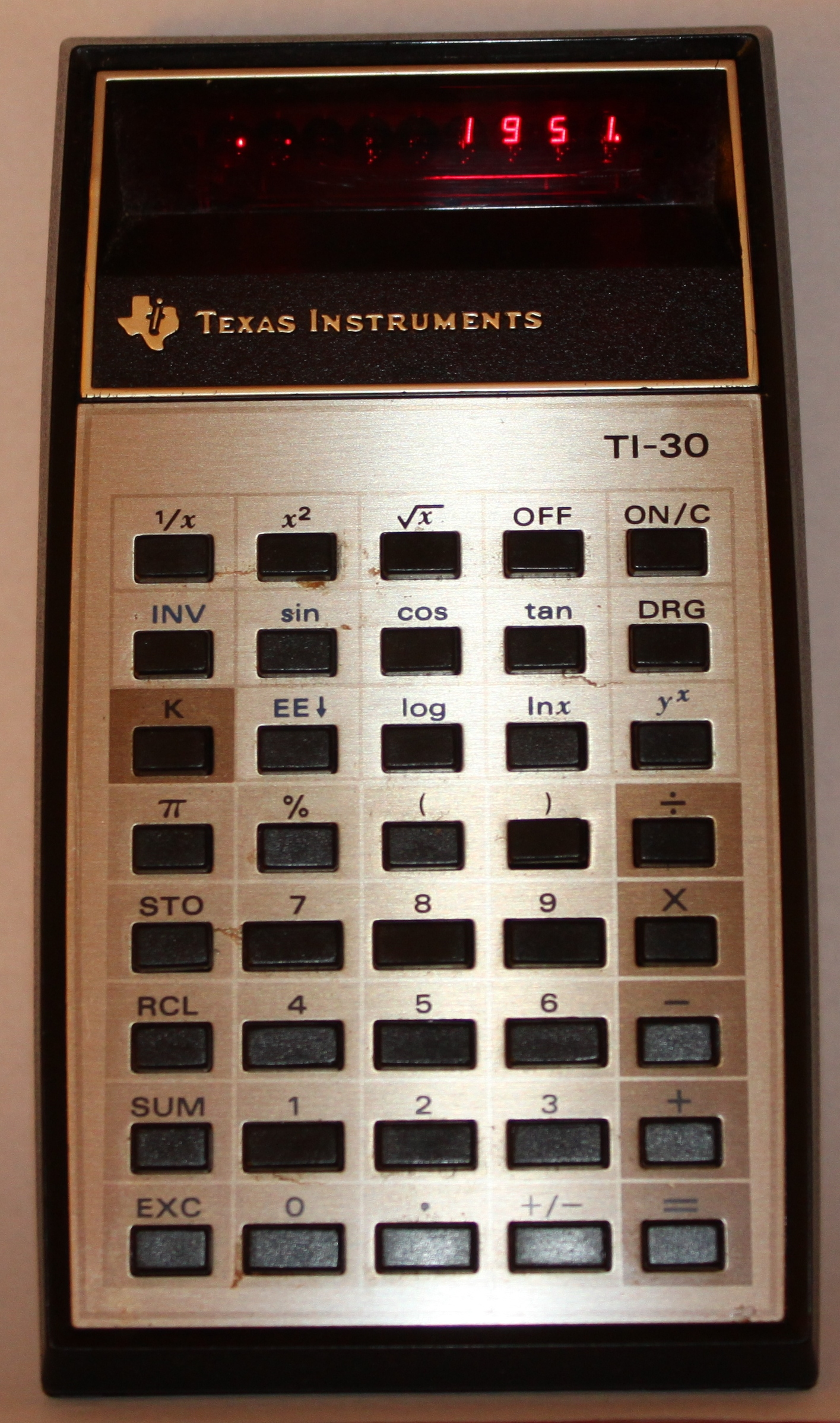
TI-30 electronic calculator, 1976

The 7400 series of transistor-transistor logic chips, developed by Texas Instruments in the 1960s, popularized the use of integrated circuits in computer logic. The military-grade version of this was the 5400 series.

==== Microprocessor ====
Texas Instruments invented the hand-held calculator (a prototype called "Cal Tech") in 1967 and the single-chip microcomputer in 1971, was assigned the first patent on a single-chip microprocessor (invented by Gary Boone) on September 4, 1973. This was disputed by Gilbert Hyatt, formerly of the Micro Computer Company, in August 1990, when he was awarded a patent superseding TI's. This was overturned on June 19, 1996, in favor of TI (note: Intel is usually given credit with Texas Instruments for the almost-simultaneous invention of the microprocessor).

==== First speech synthesis chip ====
In 1978, Texas Instruments introduced the first single-chip linear predictive coding speech synthesizer. In 1976, TI began a feasibility study of memory-intensive applications for bubble memory then being developed. They soon focused on speech applications. This resulted in the development of the TMC0280 one-chip linear predictive coding speech synthesizer, which was the first time a single silicon chip had electronically replicated the human voice. This was used in several TI commercial products beginning with Speak & Spell, which was introduced at the Summer Consumer Electronics Show in June 1978. In 2001, TI left the speech synthesis business, selling it to Sensory Inc. of Santa Clara, California.

=== Consumer electronics and computers ===
In May 1954, Texas Instruments designed and built a prototype of the world's first transistor radio, and, through a partnership with Industrial Development Engineering Associates of Indianapolis, Indiana, the 100% solid-state radio was sold to the public beginning in October of that year.

In the 1960s, company president Pat Haggerty had a team that included Jack Kilby to work on a handheld calculator project. Kilby and two other colleagues created the Cal-Tech, a three-pound battery-powered calculator that could do basic math and fit six-digit numbers on its display. This 4.25 x 6.15 x 1.75 inch calculator's processor would originate the vast majority of Texas Instruments’ revenue.

In 1973, the handheld calculator SR-10 (named after slide rule) and in 1974, the handheld scientific calculator SR-50 were issued by TI. Both had red LED-segments numeric displays. The optical design of the SR-50 is somewhat similar to the HP-35 edited by Hewlett-Packard before in early 1972, but buttons for the operations "+", "–", ... are in the right of the number block and the decimal point lies between two neighboring digits.

TI remained active in the consumer electronics market throughout the 1970s and 1980s. Early on, this also included two digital clock models – one for desk and the other a bedside alarm. From this sprang what became the Time Products Division, which made LED watches. Though these LED watches enjoyed early commercial success due to excellent quality, it was short-lived due to poor battery life. LEDs were replaced with LCD watches for a short time, but these could not compete due to styling issues, excessive model variety, and price points. The watches were manufactured in Dallas and then Lubbock, Texas. Several spin-offs of the Speak & Spell, such as the Speak & Read and Speak & Math, were introduced soon thereafter.

In 1979, TI entered the home computer market with the TI-99/4, a competitor to computers such as the Apple II, TRS-80, and the later Atari 400/800 and VIC-20. By late 1982, TI was dominating the U.S. home computer market, shipping 5,000 computers a day from its factory in Lubbock. It discontinued the TI-99/4A (1981), the sequel to the 99/4, in late 1983 amid an intense price war waged primarily against Commodore. At the 1983 Winter CES, TI showed models 99/2 and the Compact Computer 40, the latter aimed at professional users. The TI Professional (1983) ultimately joined the ranks of the many unsuccessful MS-DOS and x86-based—but non-compatible—competitors to the IBM PC (the founders of Compaq, an early leader in PC compatibles, all came from TI). The company for years successfully made and sold PC-compatible laptops before withdrawing from the market and selling its product line to Acer in 1997.

=== Defense electronics ===
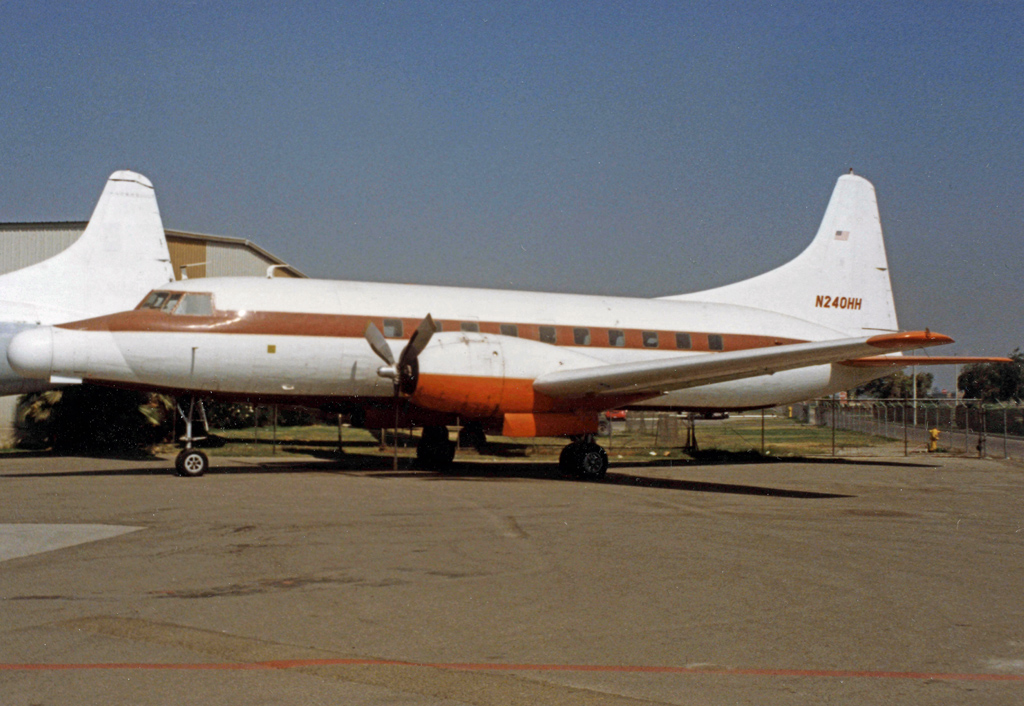
TI operated this Convair 240 on experimental work in the 1980s fitted with a modified extended nose section.

TI entered the defense electronics market in 1942 with submarine detection equipment, based on the seismic exploration technology previously developed for the oil industry. The division responsible for these products was known at different times as the Laboratory & Manufacturing Division, the Apparatus Division, the Equipment Group, and the Defense Systems & Electronics Group (DSEG).

During the early 1980s, TI instituted a quality program which included Juran training, as well as promoting statistical process control, Taguchi methods, and Design for Six Sigma. In the late 1980s, the company, along with Eastman Kodak and Allied Signal, began involvement with Motorola, institutionalizing Motorola's Six Sigma methodology. Motorola, which originally developed the Six Sigma methodology, began this work in 1982. In 1992, the DSEG division of Texas Instruments' quality-improvement efforts were rewarded by winning the Malcolm Baldrige National Quality Award for manufacturing.

==== Infrared and radar systems ====
TI developed the AAA-4 infrared search and track device in the late 1950s and early 1960s for the F-4B Phantom for passive scanning of jet-engine emissions, but it possessed limited capabilities and was eliminated on F-4Ds and later models.

In 1956, TI began research on infrared technology that led to several line scanner contracts, with the addition of a second scan mirror, to the invention of the first forward-looking infrared (FLIR) in 1963, with production beginning in 1966. In 1972, TI invented the common module FLIR concept, greatly reducing cost and allowing reuse of common components.

TI went on to produce side-looking radar systems, the first terrain-following radar and surveillance radar systems for both the military and the FAA. TI demonstrated the first solid-state radar called Molecular Electronics for Radar Applications (MERA). In 1976, TI developed a microwave landing system prototype. In 1984, TI developed the first inverse synthetic-aperture radar. The first single-chip gallium arsenide radar module was developed. In 1991, the military microwave integrated circuit program was initiated, as a joint effort with Raytheon.

==== Missiles and laser-guided bombs ====
In 1961, TI won the guidance and control system contract for the defense suppression AGM-45 Shrike anti-radiation missile. This led later to the prime on the high-speed antiradiation missile (AGM-88 HARM) development contract in 1974 and production in 1981.

In 1964, TI began developing the first laser guidance system for precision-guided munitions, leading to the Paveway series of laser-guided bombs (LGBs). The first LGB was the BOLT-117.

In 1969, TI won the Harpoon (missile) Seeker contract. In 1986, TI won the Army FGM-148 Javelin fire-and-forget man-portable antitank guided missile in a joint venture with Martin Marietta. In 1991, TI was awarded the contract for the AGM-154 Joint Standoff Weapon.

In 1988, TI paid the U.S. government $5.2 million to "settle allegations one of its divisions overcharged the government on contracts for guided missiles sold to the Navy".

==== Military computers ====
TI's research and development of military temperature-range silicon transistors and integrated circuits (ICs) led to TI winning contracts for the first IC-based computer for the U.S. Air Force in 1961 (the so-called Molecular Electronic Computer) and for ICs for the Minuteman Missile the following year. In 1968, TI developed the data systems for the Mariner Program. In 1991, TI won the F-22 Radar and Computer development contract.

==== Divestiture to Raytheon ====
As the defense industry consolidated, TI sold its defense business to the Raytheon Company in 1997 for $2.95 billion. The Department of Justice required that Raytheon divest the TI Monolithic Microwave Integrated Circuit (MMIC) operations after closing the transaction. The TI MMIC business accounted for less than $40 million in 1996 revenues, or roughly 2% of the $1.8 billion in total TI defense revenues, and was sold to TriQuint Semiconductor, Inc. Raytheon retained its own existing MMIC capabilities and has the right to license TI's MMIC technology for use in future product applications from TriQuint.

Shortly after Raytheon acquired TI DSEG, Raytheon then acquired Hughes Aircraft from General Motors. Raytheon then owned TI's mercury cadmium telluride detector business and infrared (IR) systems group. In California, it also had Hughes infrared detectors and an IR systems business. When the US government again forced Raytheon to divest a duplicate capability, the company kept the TI IR systems business and the Hughes detector business. As a result of these acquisitions, these former arch-rivals of TI systems and Hughes detectors work together.

Immediately after acquisition, DSEG was known as Raytheon TI Systems (RTIS). It is now fully integrated into Raytheon, and this designation no longer exists.

=== Artificial intelligence ===
TI was active in the area of artificial intelligence in the 1980s. In addition to ongoing developments in speech and signal processing and recognition, it developed and sold the Explorer computer family of Lisp machines. For the Explorer, a special 32-bit Lisp microprocessor was developed, which was used in the Explorer II and the TI MicroExplorer (a Lisp Machine on a NuBus board for the Apple Macintosh). AI application software developed by TI for the Explorer included the gate assignment system for Northwest Airlines and United Airlines, described as "an artificial intelligence program that captures the combined experience and knowledge of a half-dozen United operations experts". In software for the PC, it introduced "Personal Consultant", a rule-based expert system development tool and runtime engine, followed by "Personal Consultant Plus" written in the Lisp-like language from MIT known as Scheme, and the natural language menu system NLMenu.

=== Sensors and controls ===
TI was a major original-equipment manufacturer of sensor, control, protection, and RFID products for the automotive, appliance, aircraft, and other industries. The Sensors & Controls division was headquartered in Attleboro, Massachusetts.

By the mid-1980s, industrial computers known as PLC's (programmable logic controllers) were separated from Sensors & Controls as the Industrial Systems Division, which was sold in the early 1990s to Siemens.

In 2006, Bain Capital LLC, a private equity firm, purchased the Sensors & Controls division for $3.0 billion in cash. The RFID portion of the division remained part of TI, transferring to the Application Specific Products business unit of the Semiconductor division, with the newly formed independent company based in Attleboro taking the name Sensata Technologies.

=== Software ===
In 1997, TI sold its software division, along with its main products such as the CA Gen, to Sterling Software, which is now part of Computer Associates. However, TI still owns small pieces of software, such as the software for calculators such as the TI InterActive!. TI also creates a significant amount of target software for its digital signal processors, along with host-based tools for creating DSP applications.

== Finances ==
For the fiscal year 2017, Texas Instruments reported earnings of $3.682 billion, with an annual revenue of $14.961 billion, an increase of 11.9% over the previous fiscal cycle. TI shares traded at over $82 per share, and its market capitalization was valued at over $88.0 billion in October 2018. As of 2018, TI ranked 192nd on the Fortune 500 list of the largest United States corporations by revenue.

Year	Revenue in million US$	Net income in million US$	Total assets in million US$	Price per share in US$	Employees
2005	12,335	2,324	15,063	21.97	
2006	14,255	4,341	13,930	23.98	
2007	13,835	2,657	12,667	26.01	30,175
2008	12,501	1,920	11,923	19.85	29,537
2009	10,427	1,456	12,119	16.66	26,584
2010	13,966	3,184	13,401	21.60	28,412
2011	13,735	2,201	20,497	26.37	34,759
2012	12,825	1,728	20,021	25.57	34,151
2013	12,205	2,125	18,938	32.90	32,209
2014	13,045	2,777	17,372	42.61	31,003
2015	13,000	2,986	16,230	49.79	29,977
2016	13,370	3,595	16,431	59.83	29,865
2017	14,961	3,682	17,642	82.03	29,714
2018	15,784	5,580	17,137	90.46	29,888
2019	14,383	5,017	18,018	123.32	29,768
2020	14,461	5,595	19,351	162.70	30,000
2021	18,344	7,769	24,676	189.41	31,000
2022	20,028	8,749	27,207	165.22	33,000
2023	17,519	6,510	32,348		34,000

== Divisions ==
As of 2016, TI is made up of four divisions: analog products, embedded processors, digital light processing, and educational technology.

As of January 2021, the industrial market accounts for 41 percent of TI's annual revenue, and the automotive market accounts for 21 percent.

=== Other businesses ===
TI's remaining businesses consisting of DLP products (primarily used in projectors to create high-definition images), calculators and certain custom semiconductors known as application-specific integrated circuits.

==== DLP Products ====
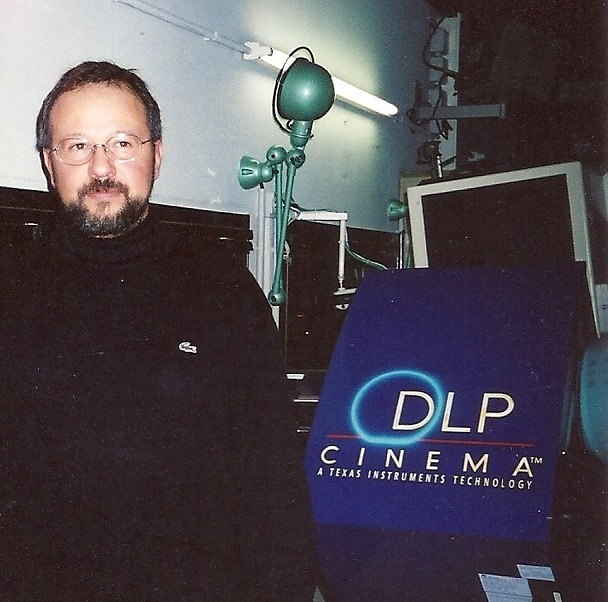
Texas Instruments, DLP Cinema Prototype Projector, Mark V, 2000

Texas Instruments sells DLP technology for TVs, video projectors, and digital cinema. On February 2, 2000, Philippe Binant, technical manager of Digital Cinema Project at Gaumont in France, realized the first digital cinema projection in Europe with the DLP Cinema technology developed by TI DLP technology enables a diverse range of display and advanced light control applications spanning industrial, enterprise, automotive, and consumer market segments.

Custom application-specific integrated circuits (ASICs)

The ASICs business develops more complex integrated-circuit solutions for clients on a custom basis.

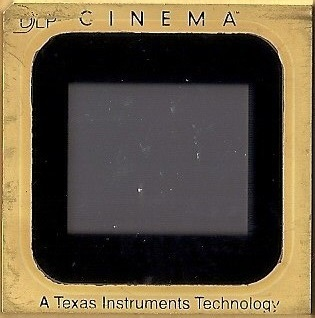
DLP Cinema, a Texas Instruments technology

==== Educational technology ====
TI has produced educational toys for children, including the Little Professor in 1976 and Dataman in 1977.

TI produces a range of calculators, with the TI-30 being one of the most popular early calculators. TI has also developed a line of graphing calculators, the first being the TI-81, and most popular being the TI-83 Plus (with the TI-84 Plus being an updated equivalent).

Many TI calculators are still sold without graphing capabilities. The TI-30 has been replaced by the TI-30X IIS. Also, some financial calculators are for sale on the TI website.

In 2007, TI released the TI-Nspire family of calculators and computer software that has similar capabilities to the calculators.

Less than 3% of Texas Instruments’ overall revenue comes from calculators, part of the $1.43 billion revenue in the "Other" section in the company's 2018 annual report. Nevertheless, the calculators are a lucrative product. For example, estimates have a $15 to $20 cost to produce TI-84 Plus which likely has a profit margin of at least 50%.

Throughout the 1980s, Texas Instruments worked closely with National Council of Teachers of Mathematics (NCTM) to develop a calculator to become the educational standard. In 1986, Connecticut School Board became the first to require a graphing calculator on state-mandated exams. Chicago Public Schools gave a free calculator to every student, beginning in the fourth grade, in 1988. New York required the calculator in 1992 for its Regents exams after first allowing it the previous year. The College Board required calculators on the Advanced Placement tests in 1993 and allowed calculators on the SAT a year later. Texas Instruments provides free services to the College Board, which administers AP tests and the SAT, and also has a group called Teachers Teaching for Technology (T3), which educates teachers on how to use its calculators.

==== TI calculator community ====
In the 1990s, with the advent of TI's graphing calculator series, programming became popular among some students. The TI-8x series of calculators (beginning with the TI-81) came with a built-in BASIC interpreter, through which simple programs could be created. The TI-83 was the first in the series to receive native assembly. Around the same time that these programs were first being written, programmers began creating websites to host their work, along with tutorials and other calculator-relevant information. This led to the formation of TI calculator webrings and eventually a few large communities, including ticalc.org.

The TI community reached the height of its popularity in the early 2000s, with many new websites and programming groups being started. In fact, the aforementioned community sites were exploding with activity, with close to 100 programs being uploaded daily by users of the sites. Also, a competition existed between both sites to be the top site in the community, which helped increase interest and activity in the community.

One of the common unifying forces that has united the community over the years has been the rather contentious relationship with TI regarding control over its graphing calculators. TI graphing calculators generally fall into two distinct groups—the older ones powered by the Zilog Z80 and the newer ones running on the Motorola 68000 series. Both lines of calculators are locked by TI with checks in the hardware and through the signing of software to disable use of custom operating systems. However, users discovered the keys and published them in 2009. TI responded by sending invalid DMCA takedown notices, causing the Texas Instruments signing key controversy.

== Competitors ==
TI has the largest market share in the analog semiconductor industry, accounting for over $10 billion of the total $57 billion market in 2020.

== Acquisitions ==
- In 1996, TI acquired Tartan, Inc.
- In 1997, TI acquired Amati Communications for $395 million.
- In 1998, TI acquired GO DSP.
- In 1998, TI acquired the standard logic (semiconductor) product lines from Harris Semiconductor, which included the CD4000, HC4xxx, HCT, FCT, and ACT product families.
- In 1999, TI acquired Libit Signal Processing Ltd. of Herzlia, Israel for approximately $365 million in cash.
- In 1999, TI acquired Butterfly VLSI, Ltd. for approximately $50 million.
- In 1999, TI acquired Telogy Networks for $457 million.
- In 1999, TI acquired Unitrode Corporation (NYSE:UTR).
- In 2000, TI acquired Burr-Brown Corporation for $7.6 billion.
- In 2001, TI acquired Graychip.
- In 2003, TI acquired Radia Inc, a San-Jose based companied who had developed a developed an ASIC WiFi front end prototype without the base band processor, for about $320 million. The company has an Israeli home office.
- In 2006, TI acquired Chipcon for about $200 million.
- In 2009, TI acquired CICLON and Luminary Micro.
- In 2011, TI acquired National Semiconductor for $6.5 billion.
- In 2021, TI acquired an operational 300mm fabrication plant located in Lehi, Utah from Micron for $900 million.
- In 2022, TI acquired icDirectory France
- In February 2026, Texas Instruments announced its intent to buy Silicon Labs for $7.5 billion.

=== National Semiconductor acquisition ===
On April 4, 2011, Texas Instruments announced that it had agreed to buy National Semiconductor for $6.5 billion in cash. TI paid $25 per share of National Semiconductor stock, which was an 80% premium over the share price of $14.07 as of April 4, 2011, close. The deal made TI the world's largest maker of analog technology components. The companies formally merged on September 23, 2011.

== Leadership ==
=== President ===
1. John Erik Jonsson, 1951–1958
2. Patrick Eugene Haggerty, 1958–1967
3. Mark Shepherd Jr., 1967–1976
4. J. Fred Bucy Jr., 1976–1985
5. Jerry Ray Junkins, 1986–1996
6. Thomas James Engibous, 1996–2004
7. Richard Kevin Templeton, 2004–2023
8. Haviv Ilan, 2023–present

=== Chairman of the board ===
1. Eugene McDermott, 1953–1955
2. Cecil Howard Green, 1955–1958
3. John Erik Jonsson, 1958–1969
4. Patrick Eugene Haggerty, 1969–1976
5. Mark Shepherd Jr., 1976–1988
6. Jerry Ray Junkins, 1988–1996
7. James R. Adams, 1996–1998
8. Thomas James Engibous, 1998–2008
9. Richard Kevin Templeton, 2008–present

== See also ==
- Anylite Technology
- EnOcean
- Symbian Foundation
- OMAP
- Melendy E. Lovett
- SolarMagic
- Texas Instruments DaVinci
