= Lust for Blood =

Lust for Blood may refer to:

- "Lust for Blood", a song by Gackt from their 2003 album Crescent
- "Lust for Blood", a song by Powerwolf from their 2013 album Preachers Of The Night
- Lust for Blood (album), a 2006 album by Velvet Acid Christ

== See also ==
- Bloodlust (disambiguation)
- Blood fetishism, a usually pathological desire related to blood
