= Lusty =

Lusty may refer to:

- Operation Lusty, a non-combat military operation
- HMS Illustrious (R06), a light aircraft carrier of the Royal Navy nicknamed Lusty

== People with the surname ==
- Horace Lusty (1895–1972), New Zealand railway engineer
- Robert Lusty (1909–1991), British journalist and publisher

== See also ==
- Lust (disambiguation)
