= Casein paint =

Water-soluble medium with caesin-based binder

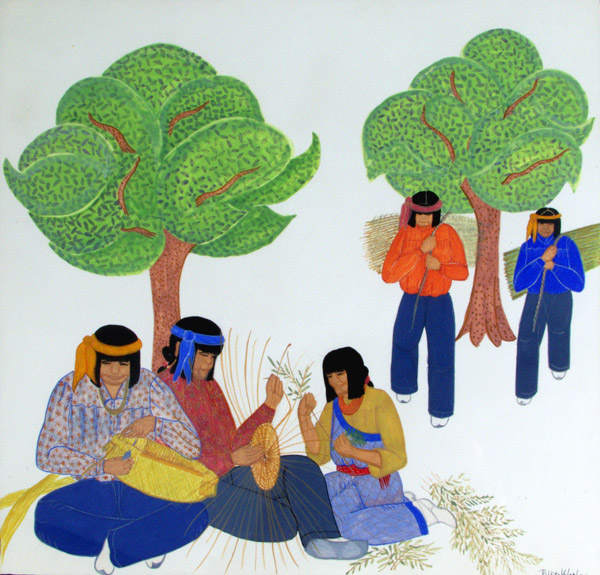
Basketmaking by Pablita Velarde (Santa Clara Pueblo), casein painting on board. L 28.3 × W 28.3 cm, Bandelier National Monument

Casein paint, occasionally marketed as milk paint, derived from casein, is a fast-drying, water-soluble medium used by artists. It is a paint bound with casein. It can be made from milk and lime, generally with pigment added for color.

== Description ==
It generally has a glue-like consistency, but can be thinned with water to the degree that fits a particular artist's style and desired result. It can be used on canvas panels, illustration boards, paper, wood, and masonite. Because the dried paint film is inflexible and brittle, it is not appropriate for heavy impasto on flexible supports like canvas; canvas laminated to board is more suitable. Casein paint is reworkable and can be used for underpainting. It generally dries to a matte finish. The paint adheres best to porous substrates such as wood, its common traditional use, but will adhere also and with greater sheen to non-porous ones, especially if mixed with appropriate bonding agents.

== History ==
The ancient history of milk in paint is attested by a primitive combination of wild bovid milk and ochre used on a stone tool found in a South African cave and dated to 49,000 years ago, tens of thousands of years before the Neolithic domestication of cattle. Goats' milk provided the binder for lacquer paint used on the Ancient Egyptian tomb of King Tutankhamun.

Before the invention of acrylics, most house paint binders not made from oil instead used casein. Abundant historical production documents outline the manufacture of milk paint on an industrial scale. However, because oil-based and acrylic-based paint resins have come to be made in vast quantities with common oils, such as linseed, and petrochemicals, their price can be much lower than that of milk paint, which commercially is now made only on a small scale.

== Uses ==
Casein paint has been used since ancient Egyptian times as a form of distemper paint, and is still used today. One of the qualities for which artists value casein paint is that unlike gouache, it dries to an even consistency, making it ideal for murals. Also, it can visually resemble oil painting more than most other water-based paints, and works well as an underpainting.

Casein paint loses its solubility with time and exposure and becomes water-resistant. It is suited most to inflexible surfaces, including furniture. It can be buffed to a soft velvet finish when dry, or varnished for a gloss finish.

Today, milk paint is used not just on antique furniture and accurate replicas of it but on pieces of modern style. The resulting finish has depth of color and a mottled appearance that may be used to give furnishings and rooms a rustic, shabby chic character.

== Manufacture ==
The binder for casein paint is made by dissolving casein in an alkali, usually Lime, ammonium carbonate, or borax. Casein itself is precipitated from milk by the action of an acid or the enzyme rennet. Lime casein works well on porous surfaces, even outdoors, though it has a short shelf life and must be used with pigments that are balanced against the binder's low pH. Ammonium carbonate casein has similar strengths and weaknesses. Borax casein has a shelf life of several weeks, is pH neutral, and can be used outdoors through the addition of linseed oil. Due to its short shelflife Lime-based casein paint is usually sold as a powder; hydrated on site, activating the lime-casein mixture yielding a durable paint that is caustic until dried.

== Casein artists ==
Yantonai Dakota artist Oscar Howe of South Dakota used casein extensively.

Santa Clara Pueblo artist Pablita Velarde created a series of more than 70 paintings of everyday Native American life in New Mexico for Bandelier National Monument between 1937 and 1943, painted mostly on masonite using casein paints.

Casein was widely used by commercial illustrators as the material of choice until the late 1960s when, with the advent of acrylic paint, casein became less popular. John Berkey continued to use casein in combination with acrylics in most of his paintings. Dick Tracy (1960), and Popeye (1960), two early paintings by Andy Warhol, who had been a commercial illustrator before becoming a fine artist, were painted with casein.

== See also ==
- Painting and the environment
