= Velvet Acid Christ =

American electro-industrial band

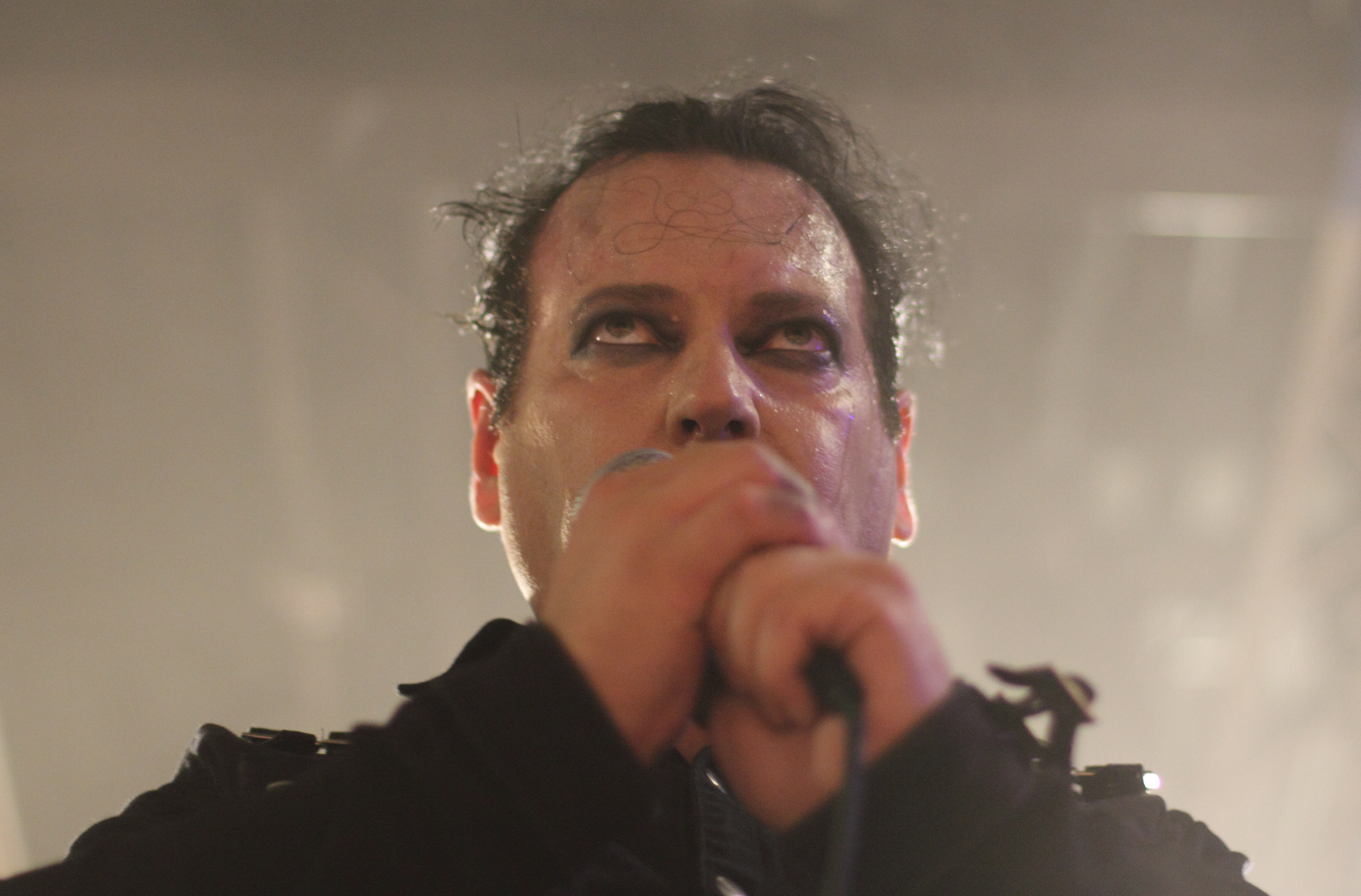
- Bryan Erickson performing in 2016

Background information
- Origin: Denver, Colorado, US
- Genres: EBM; electro-industrial; dark electro
- Years active: 1990–present
- Labels: dependent; EDT; Metropolis; Off-Beat; Pendragon
- Members: Bryan Erickson
- Website: www.velvetacidchrist.com

Velvet Acid Christ (VAC) is an electro-industrial band based in Denver, Colorado. The band was formed in 1990 by its leader vocalist, musician, and producer Bryan Erickson (aka Disease Factory), and later featured various ex-members of Toxic Coma. The project gained limited popularity in Europe's underground nightclub scenes during the mid-1990s with the compilation Church of Acid (1996) before expanding into other markets in the goth and industrial subcultures. The band's discography includes 14 albums, the latest being Ora Oblivionis (2019).

== History ==
=== Early projects, early changes, and first albums (1990–1995) ===
In the early 1990s, Erickson and Gregory, both residents of Colorado, brought together their shared interest in creating music to record a series of demos in Erickson's mom's basement. With the addition of Gary Slaughter and Chris Workman, the group attempted several bands, including Disease Disco Factory, a parody of then-popular Dance group C+C Music Factory. Following a turbulent period for Erickson and Slaughter, Workman left the group. Slaughter and Erickson experimented with two new side-projects, Cyber Christ and Vortex. Cyber Christ explored a harsh and melancholy sound that was a sharp contrast to the group's other projects. When Erickson discovered that the term "Cyber Christ" had been used in the 1992 film The Lawnmower Man, he renamed the band Velvet Acid Christ "in honor of a bad acid trip". The Vortex project was merged into Velvet Acid Christ to form one body of work.

In 1994, Workman returned to assist with the band's self-produced Gothic-styled demo tape, Fate. Given encouraging response from friends, the band followed up with other self-produced albums, 1994's Pestilence, a dance-oriented album, and 1995's Neuralblastoma, a harder-sounding album.

Erickson, along with friends and minor contributors Steve Bird and Dan Olson, started the brief-lived record label Electro Death Trip (EDT) Records to better promote these recordings. In 1995, the three began distributing hand-made CD copies of Fate, Pestilence, and Neuralblastoma for resale in local music shops.

=== Label interest, touring, and a troubled rise (1996–2000) ===
Cover art for 1996's Church of Acid, which was well received in Europe

"We Have To See We Have To Know", from Church of Acid (0:29)
An expansive instrumental composed in the project's earlier days

Slaughter and Workman temporarily left the band during the first half of 1996 as Erickson continued the project alone, handing out copies of Velvet Acid Christ's recordings to industry representatives, including musician Bill Leeb of industrial pioneers Front Line Assembly. Leeb passed the CD on to Thorsten Stroht, a media promoter with European label Off-Beat Records. Off-Beat A&R negotiated a deal with the band.

For their first Off-Beat release, the group submitted 1996's Church of Acid, a compilation of selected tracks from Velvet Acid Christ's first three albums with an additional two new tracks, "Disflux" and "Futile". Church of Acid was well received in Europe, and "Futile" became a regularly played track in many nightclubs across the continent. In 1997, United States label Pendragon Records released Church of Acid in America, though the two new tracks were removed due to a lack of trademark clearance for television samples used in the songs. The album hit #15 on the CMJ RPM chart in the U.S.

The band's next album, Calling Ov the Dead, was rejected by Off-Beat for not sounding edgy enough, prompting Slaughter's permanent departure. The band addressed the label's concerns and released Calling Ov the Dead in late 1997, with American distribution following through Pendragon in 1998. In the process, Erickson had accumulated a substantial financial debt.

With a line-up consisting of Erickson, Stroht and German musician Ingo Beitz, the band toured Europe in 1998 with Off-Beat label-mate Suicide Commando, which attracted the attention of Metropolis Records, the largest industrial label in United States. The parent label of Pendragon, Metropolis distributed the album Neuralblastoma, as a partnership that would endure.

Velvet Acid Christ spent the majority of 1999 in the studio, first collaborating with Germany's Funker Vogt on a remix EP entitled Velvet Acid Christ Vs Funker Vogt: The Remix Assault, then shifting to Velvet Acid Christ's next full-length recording, Fun With Knives. With Workman an occasional contributor, Erickson sought production assistance on Fun With Knives from the bands Luxt and New 4th Army (Josh and Lisa Wilson.) Fun with Knives, released by Metropolis and new Off-Beat sub-label Dependent, became the band's best-selling album peaking at #6 on the CMJ RPM Charts and ranked #18 Album on the German Alternative Charts (DAC) for 1999. Sales were propelled by the singles "Decypher" and "Fun with Drugs", and by the track "Slut", which featured vocals from Luxt's Anna Christine. "Fun with Drugs" was the #7 single on the DAC top 50 singles chart for 1999.

In spite of the success of the band, stress had led Erickson into depression and increased drug abuse, which channeled into the creation of the band's next album, Twisted Thought Generator, which peaked at #9 on the CMJ RPM Charts. Simultaneously, the band toured Europe with industrial acts Project X and Stromkern and toured the United States and Canada with bands Din_Fiv and Haujobb. The line-up of the band during this period was unstable. Workman, citing a conversion to Christianity, resigned from the band with a request that his name be retracted from all previous albums. The first leg of the European tour consisted of Erickson, Bird and Stroht; the second leg, Erickson and Olson. The North American tour was performed by Erickson, Stroht and drummer Paul Lipman. With various contributors, Erickson completed Twisted Thought Generator. Due to lingering disputes, he withdrew the band from Dependent Records and submitted the album to Metropolis.

=== Change of pace, new early material, and beyond (2001–) ===
Erickson placed Velvet Acid Christ on a short hiatus in 2001, as he abandoned his dependence on drugs in favour of exercise and a vegan raw foodist diet. Newly clean, Erickson created the 2003 album Hex Angel: Utopia/Dystopia. Though critical response was mixed, Hex Angel: Utopia/Dystopia ranked #1 on Germany's Deutsche Alternative Charts (DAC) for four weeks after its release, and the album's single "Pretty Toy" peaked at #4 on the DAC during the same year. The album also marked the band's short-lived return to Dependent Records.

Erickson spent 2004 releasing and reissuing some of Velvet Acid Christ's earliest material. With the four-volume compilation series Between the Eyes, the band published a collection of its singles and B-sides, then followed with subsequent re-releases of Fate (Vol. 2), Pestilence (Vol. 3), and Neuralblastoma (Vol. 4). The band also offered free MP3 downloads of Dimension 8 and Oblivion Interface on its website until early 2005. Dimension 8, which had been available as a hidden bonus on Twisted Thought Generator, and Oblivion Interface (informally known as Between the Eyes, Vol. 5) provided fans with previously unheard work from the Cyber Christ-Vortex era of 1991–1994.

In 2005, Erickson collaborated with guitarist Todd Loomis on a new album, Lust for Blood, which was released on September 26, 2006. With Lust for Blood, the crew labored intensively to create a new overall sound while maintaining the band's original characteristics. Following its release, Lust for Blood peaked at #1 on Germany's DAC and ranked #5 on the DAC Top 50 Albums of 2006; the album's single release, "Wound", ranked on the DAC's singles chart for eight weeks, peaking at #1 and ranking #5 on the year's singles chart.

In October 2009, Velvet Acid Christ, Erickson wrote most of the LP, Loomis did a little work on it and was busy working on his project "The Twilight Garden", released The Art of Breaking Apart. This LP was a tribute to bands like Current 93 and Death in June and brought VAC many new fans while distancing some of his previous fans. It was the first album to feature an acoustic guitar and untreated vocals redefining what Velvet Acid Christ could sound like. 2010 saw the release of the Caustic Disco EP featuring remixes of the original song.

In 2010–2011, Bryan Erickson teamed up with William Anderson of Louisiana. William did a ton of sampling, Bryan made a bunch of VAC B-sides and turned them into Toxic Coma tracks. The project is very old with a revolving door of members, again Bryan being the main constant. This LP fuses the techno sound of Fun With Knives and the brutal black humor of Toxic Coma. This VAC side project is known as Toxic Coma Satan Rising, on Metropolis Records. Erickson then began to write more music for future VAC LPs.

In October 2012, Velvet Acid Christ released their latest LP entitled Maldire. Moving back to Renoise for the album which was also used on Toxic Coma. Due to a lack of funding for the album it features the "most software vsts to date". The release marked a return to the darker electronic sound with aggressive vocals that VAC is renowned for. Erickson formed a live band and toured extensively (2012–2014) to support the album.

On October 28, 2014, the Subconscious Landscapes LP was released, containing all the B-sides from Maldire. It features "densely layered, complex, and atmospheric tracks calling on influences in the ranges of Juno Reactor, Massive Attack, and Delerium". As a natural progression from the hypnotic grooves of past songs, the first half of the album highlights guest vocals from Sabine Theroni and Margolzata Wacht, while the second half takes a darker turn. Dire Land released in June 2015 was a remix LP meant to serve as a singles companion for Maldire and Subconscious Landscapes, with remixes from God Module, Decoded Feedback, Assemblage 23, Dead Hand Project and others. A Greatest Hits album featuring newly remastered songs built to feature "more bass and tame the high [frequencies]" was released in 2016. A webstore was launched in 2017 on the site.

== Musical style ==
The majority of the band's work is categorized among the genres of industrial, gothic rock, electro-industrial, and EBM. The band's tone ranges between angry, upbeat, sad, and psychedelic. The band's lyrical content offers a varied focus, including such topics as IRC, love, hate, depression, misanthropy, drugs, and religion. Erickson is the group's main songwriter.

Much of Velvet Acid Christ's musical composition has been produced with synthesizers and computer software. Other instruments used by the band include sequencers such as drum machines and electric guitars with effects pedals. Sampling is another technique commonly employed by the band.

=== Influences ===
The band cites many musical influences, including among many others Aphex Twin, Rush, Skinny Puppy, Cocteau Twins, The Cure, Siouxsie and the Banshees, and Astral Projection.

== Personnel ==
=== Current members ===
- Bryan Erickson (1990 – present) – lead vocals, guitar, mixing, production,

== Discography ==
=== Albums ===
- Fate – (CS album, limited edition [150 copies]) 1994 – no label (CD album, limited edition [50 copies]) 1994 – no label
- Pestilence – (CS, limited edition [100 copies]) 1994 – no label (CD, limited edition [50 copies]) 1994 – no label
- Neuralblastoma – (CDr album, limited edition) 1995 – Electric Death Trip Records
- Calling ov the Dead – (CD album) 1998 – Pendragon Records (US), Off Beat (EU)
- Fun with Knives – (CD album) 1999 – Metropolis (US), Dependent Records (EU)
- Twisted Thought Generator – (CD album, enhanced) 2000 – Metropolis
- Hex Angel: (Utopia – Dystopia) – (CD album) 2003 – Dependent Records (EU), Metropolis (US)
- Lust for Blood – (CD album) 2006 – Metropolis
- The Art of Breaking Apart – (CD album) 2009 – Metropolis
- Maldire – (CD album) 2012 – Metropolis (US), Dependent Records (EU)
- Subconscious Landscapes – (CD album) 2014 – Metropolis
- Dire Land – (The Remix Album) 2015 – Metropolis
- Ora Oblivionis – (CD album) 2019

=== Compilations ===
- Church of Acid – (CD) 1996 – Off Beat (EU) (CD) 1997 – Pendragon Records (US) (compilation of tracks later released as 'Between The Eyes' volumes 2–4)
- Neuralblastoma – (CD album, limited edition [2500 copies]) 1998 – Metropolis (US) / Off Beat (EU) (second compilation of tracks later released as 'Between The Eyes' volumes 2–4)
- Between the Eyes Vol. 1 – (CD) 2004 – Metropolis (singles compilation)
- Between the Eyes Vol. 2 – (CD) 2004 – Metropolis (re-release of early album "Fate" (orig. rel. 1994))
- Between the Eyes Vol. 3 – (CD) 2004 – Metropolis (re-release of early album "Pestilence" (orig. rel. 1994))
- Between the Eyes Vol. 4 – (CD) 2004 – Metropolis (re-release of early album "Neuralblastoma" (orig. rel. 1995))
- Greatest Hits – (CD album) 2016 – Metropolis

=== EPs ===
- Decypher – (CD Maxi) 1999 – Metropolis
- Fun With Drugs – (CD Maxi) 1999 – Dependent Records (Strictly same content as on "Decypher")
- Razordisc – (CD Maxi, limited edition) 1999 – Dependent Records, only available as part of the limited edition Fun With Knives (retitled Fun With Razors) boxset
- The Remix Wars: Strike 4 – Velvet Acid Christ vs. Funker Vogt – (CD) 1999 – Metropolis (US), Off Beat (EU) • (CD) 2002 – Synthetic Symphony
- Dial8 – (CD Maxi, Enhanced) 2001 – Metropolis (Includes 'Decipher' fanmade video by Cardinal91)
- Pretty Toy – (CD Maxi) 2003 – Dependent Records (EU), Metropolis (US)
- Wound – (CD Maxi) 2006 – Metropolis
- Caustic Disco – (CD Maxi) 2009 – Dependent Records (EU), 2010 – Metropolis (US)
- Wrack – (CD Maxi) 2017 – Metropolis (US)

=== Digital ===
- Dimension 8 – (MP3 Files) 2000, no label (on "Twisted Thought Generator" CD as a data track, also released online for free, temporarily. made prior to 1993)
- Oblivion Interface – (MP3 Files) 2004, no label (released online for free, temporarily. made between 1992 and 1994)
