= Shades of red =

Varieties of the color red

Red

Spectral coordinates
- Wavelength: ~630–740 nm
- Frequency: ~480–405 THz

Common connotations
- heat, anger, passion, sexuality, love, socialism, Christmas, Valentine's Day, danger

Color coordinates
- Hex triplet: #FF0000
- sRGB^{B} (r, g, b): (255, 0, 0)
- HSV (h, s, v): (0°, 100%, 100%)
- CIELCh_{uv} (L, C, h): (53, 179, 12°)
- Source: HTML/CSS
- B: Normalized to [0–255] (byte)

Varieties of the color red may differ in hue, chroma (also called saturation, intensity, or colorfulness), lightness (or value, tone, or brightness), or in two or three of these qualities. Variations in value are also called tints and shades, a tint being a red or other hue mixed with white, a shade being mixed with black. A large selection of these various colors is shown below.

== In specific color systems ==
=== Red (RGB) ===
Red (RGB)
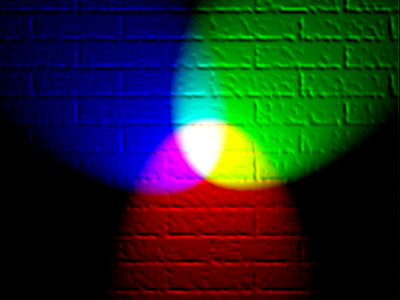
- Red, green and blue lights, representing the three basic additive primary colors of the RGB color system, red, green, and blue

Color coordinates
- Hex triplet: #FF0000
- sRGB^{B} (r, g, b): (255, 0, 0)
- HSV (h, s, v): (0°, 100%, 100%)
- CIELCh_{uv} (L, C, h): (53, 179, 12°)
- Source: HTML/CSS
- ISCC–NBS descriptor: Vivid reddish orange
- B: Normalized to [0–255] (byte)

Red (RGB), RGB red, or electric red (as opposed to pigment red, shown below) is the brightest possible red that can be reproduced on a computer monitor. This color is an approximation of an orangish red spectral color. It is one of the three primary colors of light in the RGB color model, along with green and blue. The three additive primaries in the RGB color system are the three colors of light chosen such as to provide the maximum gamut of colors that are capable of being represented on a computer or television set, at a reasonable expense of power. Portable devices such as mobile phones might have an even narrower gamut due to this purity–power tradeoff and their "red" may be less colorful and more orangish than the standard red of sRGB.

This color is also the color called red in the X11 web colors, which were originally formulated in 1987. It is also called color wheel red. It is at precisely zero (360) degrees on the HSV color wheel, also known as the RGB color wheel (Image of RGB color wheel). Its complementary color is cyan.

Shades of red labeled with HSL, RGB, and web color names.

=== Red (CMYK) (pigment red) ===
Red (CMYK) (pigment red)
- Cyan, magenta, and yellow are the three subtractive primary colors used in printing

Color coordinates
- Hex triplet: #ED1B24
- sRGB^{B} (r, g, b): (237, 27, 36)
- HSV (h, s, v): (357°, 89%, 93%)
- CIELCh_{uv} (L, C, h): (51, 157, 12°)
- Source: CMYK
- ISCC–NBS descriptor: Vivid reddish orange
- B: Normalized to [0–255] (byte)

Pigment red is the color red that is achieved by mixing process (printer's) magenta and process (printer's) yellow in equal proportions. This is the color red that is shown in the diagram located at the bottom of the following website offering tintbooks for CMYK printing: Tintbooks - Get Accurate CMYK Color Results For Your Printing Projects.

The purpose of the CMYK color system is to provide the maximum possible gamut of colors capable of being reproduced in printing.

Psychedelic art made people used to brighter colors of red, and pigment colors or colored pencils called "true red" are produced by mixing pigment red with a tiny amount of white. The result approximates (with much less brightness than is possible on a computer screen) the electric red shown above.

=== Red (Crayola) ===
Red (Crayola)

Color coordinates
- Hex triplet: #ED0A3F
- sRGB^{B} (r, g, b): (237, 10, 63)
- HSV (h, s, v): (346°, 96%, 93%)
- CIELCh_{uv} (L, C, h): (50, 153, 8°)
- Source: Crayola
- ISCC–NBS descriptor: Vivid red
- B: Normalized to [0–255] (byte)

The color is defined as red in Crayola crayons.

Red was one of the original colors formulated by Crayola in 1903.

=== Red (Munsell) ===
Red (Munsell)
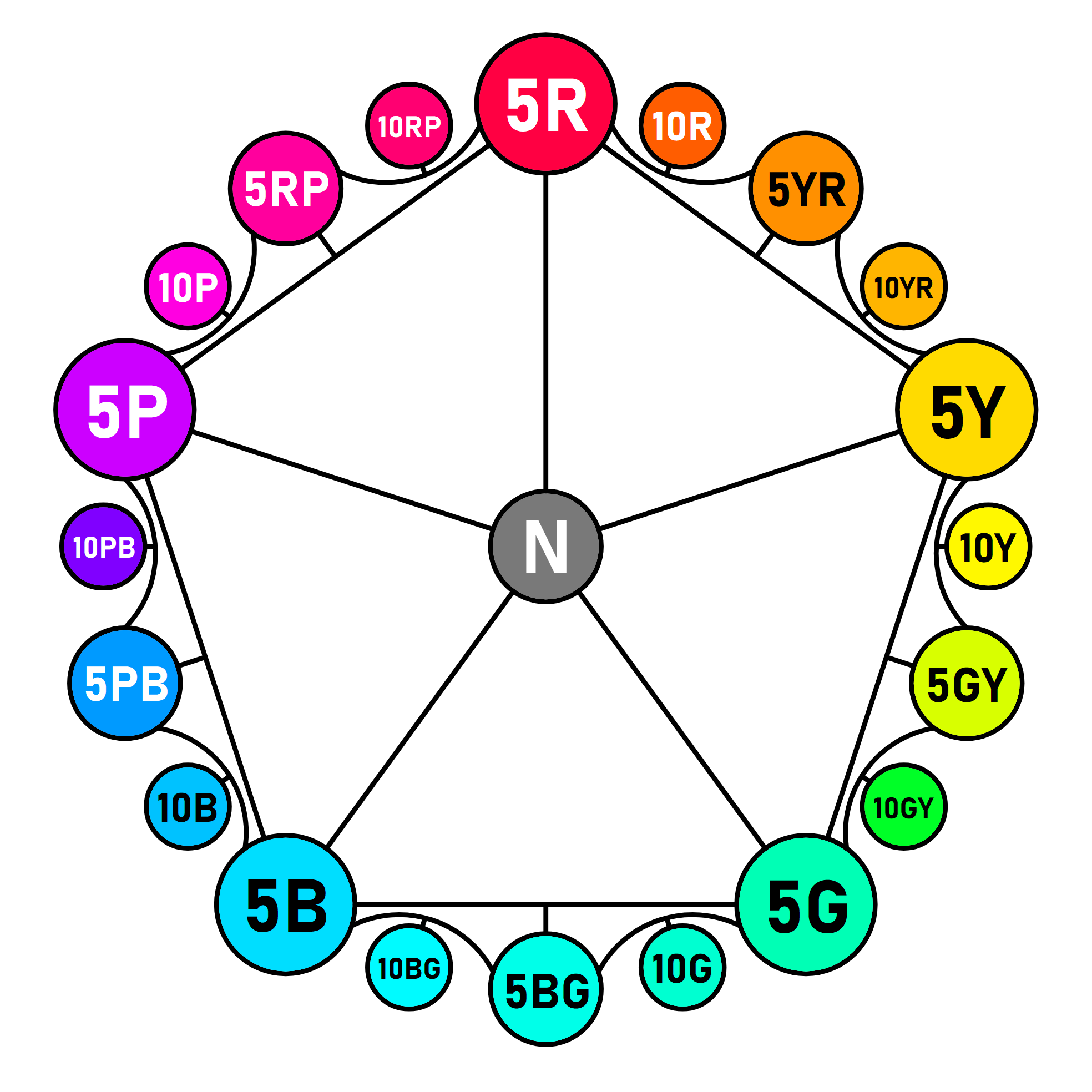
- The hues of the Munsell color system, at varying values, and maximum chroma to stay in the sRGB gamut

Color coordinates
- Hex triplet: #FF0042
- sRGB^{B} (r, g, b): (255, 0, 66)
- HSV (h, s, v): (344°, 100%, 100%)
- CIELCh_{uv} (L, C, h): (54, 167, 8°)
- Source: https://pteromys.melonisland.net/munsell/
- ISCC–NBS descriptor: Vivid red
- B: Normalized to [0–255] (byte)

The Munsell color system is a color space that specifies colors based on three color dimensions: hue, value (lightness), and chroma (colorfulness), spaced uniformly (in terms of human perception) in three dimensions in the Munsell color solid. In order for all the colors to be spaced uniformly, it was found necessary to use a color wheel with five, non-arbitrary, equally spaced primary colors: red, yellow, green, blue, and purple.

The color of the sample is the most chromatic (colorful) red in the sRGB gamut that falls in the hue of 5R (primary red) in the Munsell color space.

=== Red (NCS) (psychological primary red) ===
Red (NCS)
- Approximations within the sRGB gamut to the primary colors of the Natural Color System, a model based on the opponent process theory of color vision

Color coordinates
- Hex triplet: #C40234
- sRGB^{B} (r, g, b): (196, 2, 52)
- HSV (h, s, v): (345°, 99%, 77%)
- CIELCh_{uv} (L, C, h): (41, 127, 8°)
- Source: sRGB approximation to NCS S 1080-R
- ISCC–NBS descriptor: Vivid red
- B: Normalized to [0–255] (byte)

The color is defined as red in the NCS or Natural Color System (NCS 1080-R). The Natural Color System is a color system based on the four unique hues or psychological primary colors red, yellow, green, and blue. The NCS is based on the opponent process theory of vision.

The Natural Color System is widely used in Scandinavia.

=== Red (Pantone) ===
Red (Pantone)

Color coordinates
- Hex triplet: #ED2839
- sRGB^{B} (r, g, b): (237, 40, 57)
- HSV (h, s, v): (355°, 83%, 93%)
- CIELCh_{uv} (L, C, h): (52, 148, 10°)
- Source: Pantone TPX
- ISCC–NBS descriptor: Vivid red
- B: Normalized to [0–255] (byte)

The color is defined as red in Pantone.

The source of this color is the Pantone Textile Paper eXtended (TPX) color list, color No. 032M—Red.

== Variations of red ==
=== Amaranth ===
Amaranth
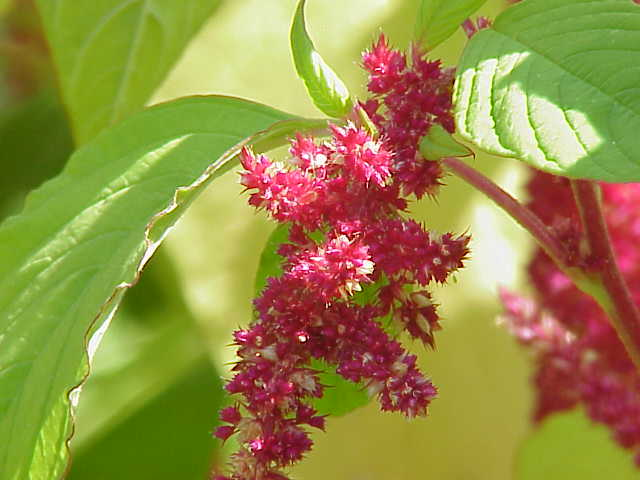
- The flower of the amaranth plant

Color coordinates
- Hex triplet: #E52B50
- sRGB^{B} (r, g, b): (229, 43, 80)
- HSV (h, s, v): (348°, 81%, 90%)
- CIELCh_{uv} (L, C, h): (51, 133, 7°)
- Source: ColorHexa
- B: Normalized to [0–255] (byte)

Amaranth is a pinkish-red color, which gets its name from the color of a red amaranth flower.

=== Apple red ===
Apple red
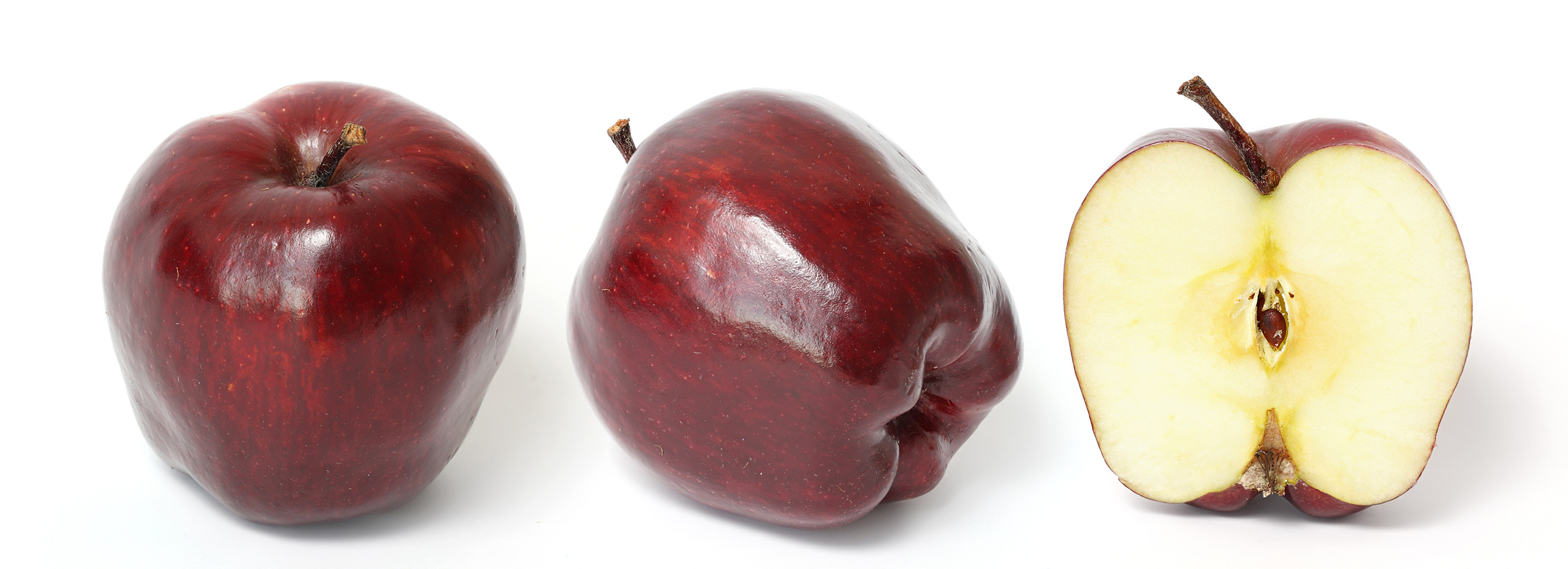
- A Red delicious

Color coordinates
- Hex triplet: #BE0032
- sRGB^{B} (r, g, b): (190, 0, 50)
- HSV (h, s, v): (344°, 100%, 75%)
- CIELCh_{uv} (L, C, h): (40, 123, 7°)
- Source: ISCC-NBS
- ISCC–NBS descriptor: Vivid red
- B: Normalized to [0–255] (byte)

Apple red is the color of the peel of an apple.

=== Barn red ===
Barn red
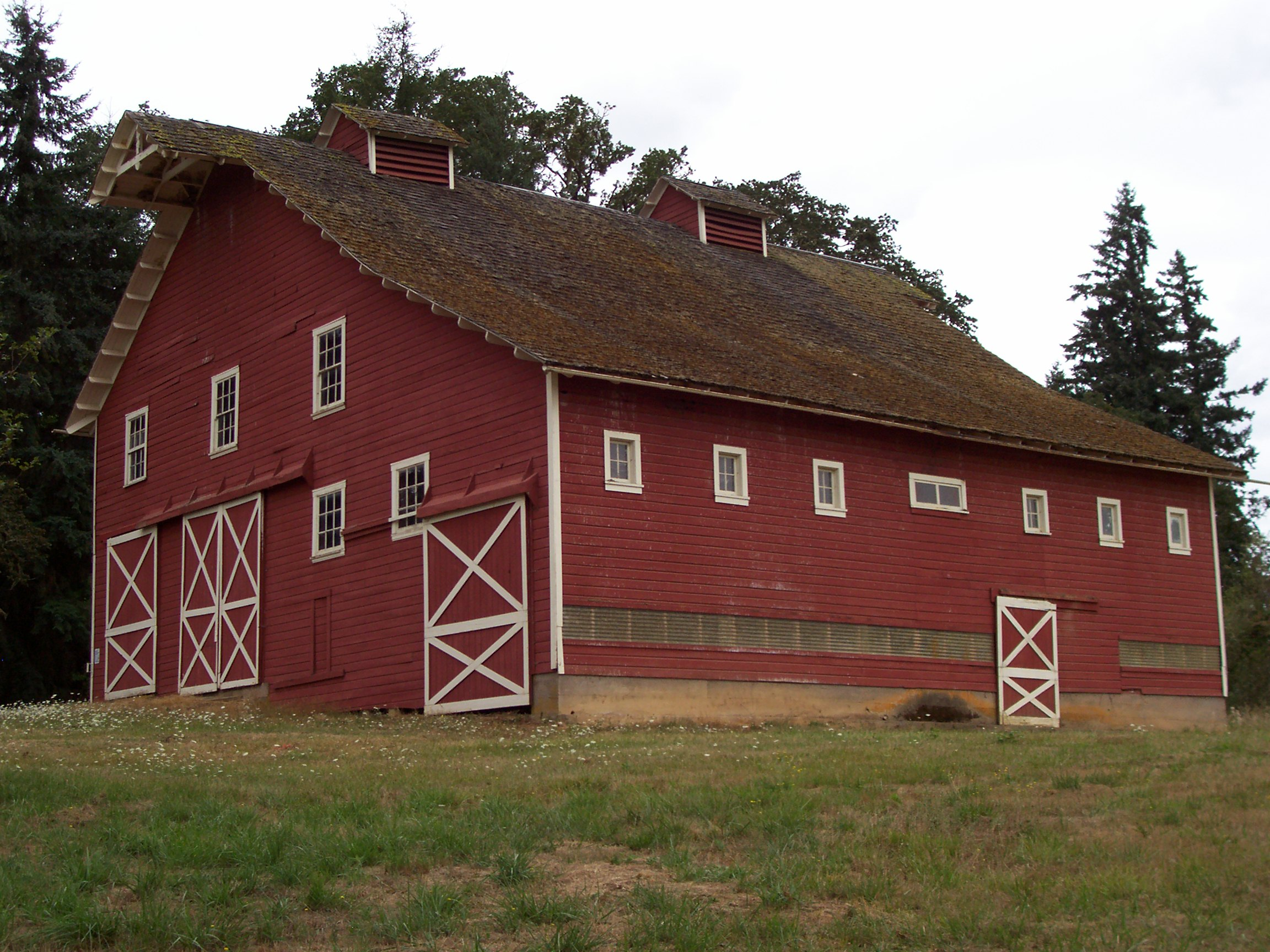
- A barn in Oregon, USA

Color coordinates
- Hex triplet: #7C0902
- sRGB^{B} (r, g, b): (124, 9, 2)
- HSV (h, s, v): (3°, 98%, 49%)
- CIELCh_{uv} (L, C, h): (25, 80, 13°)
- Source: Milk Paint
- ISCC–NBS descriptor: Deep reddish brown
- B: Normalized to [0–255] (byte)

The color barn red is one of the colors on one of the milk paint color lists, paint colors formulated to reproduce the colors historically used on the American frontier and made, like those paints were, with milk. This color is mixed with various amounts of white paint to create any desired shade of the color barn red.

=== Batorange ===
Batorange
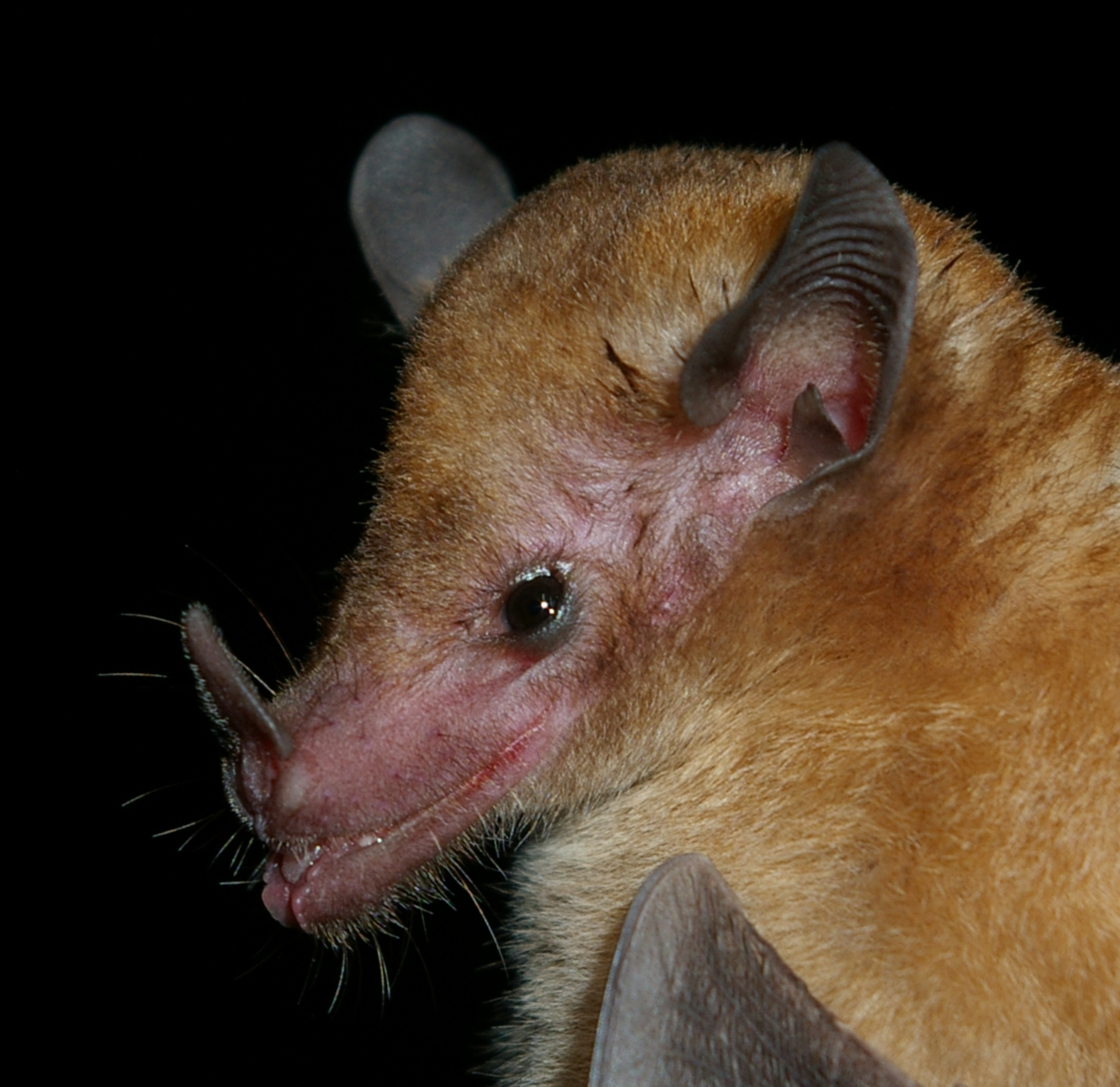
- Orange nectar bat

Color coordinates
- Hex triplet: #A42C02
- sRGB^{B} (r, g, b): (164, 44, 2)
- HSV (h, s, v): (16°, 99%, 64%)
- CIELCh_{uv} (L, C, h): (37, 99, 17°)
- Source: ColorHexa
- ISCC–NBS descriptor: Dark vermilion
- B: Normalized to [0–255] (byte)

The color batorange is a nuance of Orange Nectar Bat species, Lonchophylla robusta. It is a dark red-orange, dark vermilion, rufous color.

=== Bittersweet shimmer ===
Bittersweet shimmer

Color coordinates
- Hex triplet: #BF4F51
- sRGB^{B} (r, g, b): (191, 79, 81)
- HSV (h, s, v): (359°, 59%, 75%)
- CIELCh_{uv} (L, C, h): (49, 84, 11°)
- Source: Crayola
- ISCC–NBS descriptor: Moderate red
- B: Normalized to [0–255] (byte)

Bittersweet shimmer is one of the colors in the special set of metallic Crayola crayons called Metallic FX, the colors of which were formulated by Crayola in 2001.

Although this is supposed to be a metallic color, there is no mechanism for displaying metallic colors on a computer.

=== Blood red ===
Blood red
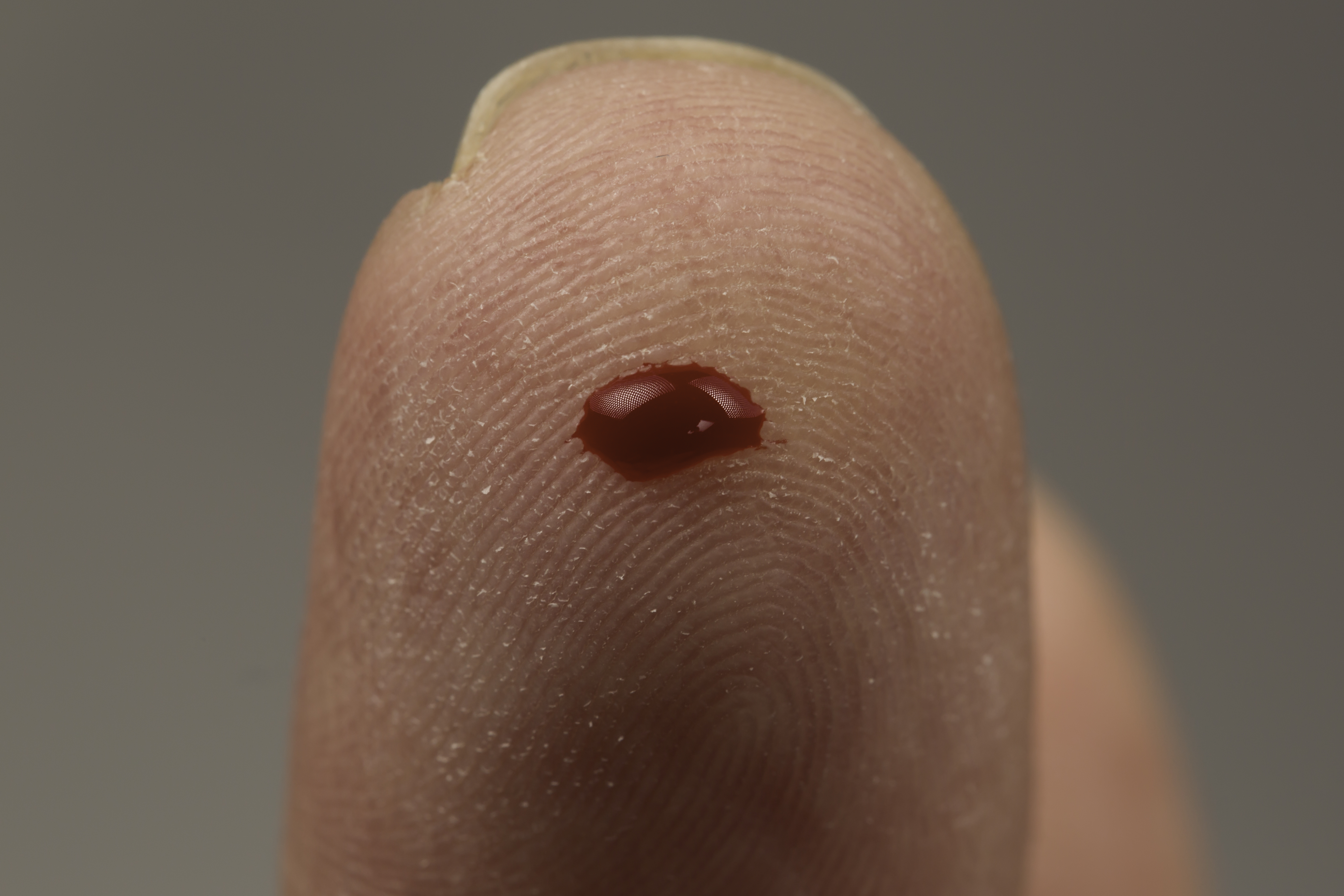

Color coordinates
- Hex triplet: #660000
- sRGB^{B} (r, g, b): (102, 0, 0)
- HSV (h, s, v): (0°, 100%, 40%)
- CIELCh_{uv} (L, C, h): (19, 65, 12°)
- Source: Thom Poole's 2017 book Life of Colour
- ISCC–NBS descriptor: Deep reddish brown
- B: Normalized to [0–255] (byte)

The color of blood red ranges from crimson to a dark brown-red and may have a slightly orange hue. In the RGB color spectrum, it often consists only of the color red, with no green or blue component; in the CMYK color model blood red has no cyan, and consists only of magenta and yellow with a small amount of black. It is frequently darker than both maroon and dark red.

In China, according to The Language of Color in China, dark blood red is sometimes referred to as "period (i.e., menstruation) red".

=== Brink pink ===
Brink pink

Color coordinates
- Hex triplet: #FB607F
- sRGB^{B} (r, g, b): (251, 96, 127)
- HSV (h, s, v): (348°, 62%, 98%)
- CIELCh_{uv} (L, C, h): (62, 109, 4°)
- Source: Crayola
- ISCC–NBS descriptor: Deep pink
- B: Normalized to [0–255] (byte)

The color brink pink was formulated by Crayola in 1990.

=== Cantaloupe melon ===
Cantaloupe melon
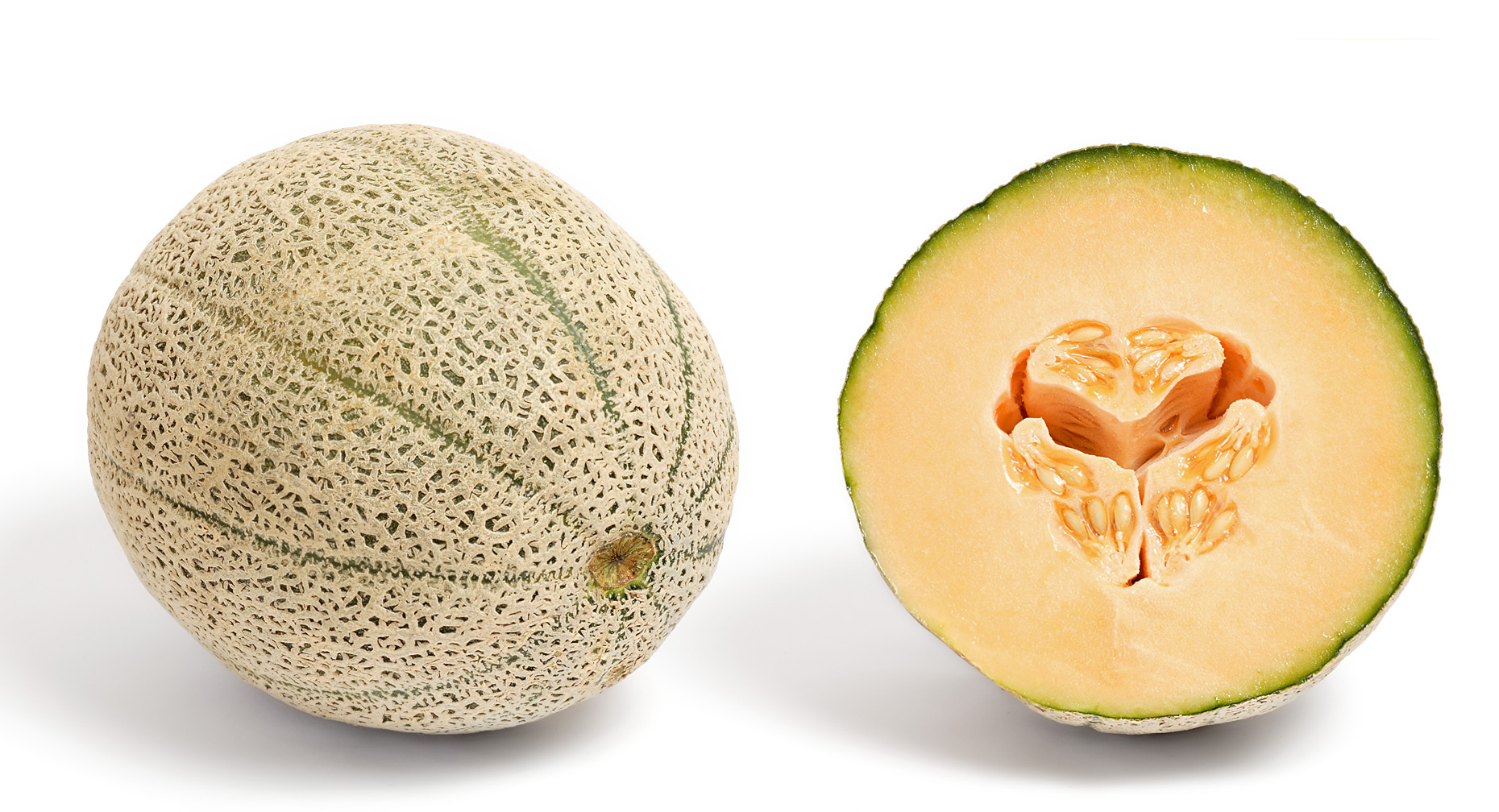
- A cantaloupe from Australia.

Color coordinates
- Hex triplet: #FDBCB4
- sRGB^{B} (r, g, b): (253, 188, 180)
- HSV (h, s, v): (7°, 29%, 99%)
- CIELCh_{uv} (L, C, h): (82, 45, 19°)
- Source: Crayola
- ISCC–NBS descriptor: Moderate yellowish pink
- B: Normalized to [0–255] (byte)

The color cantaloupe melon is a representation of the color of the interior flesh of a cantaloupe, the most commonly consumed melon.

The first recorded use of melon as a color name in English was in 1892.

In 1958, melon was formulated as one of the Crayola colors.

=== Cardinal red ===
Cardinal
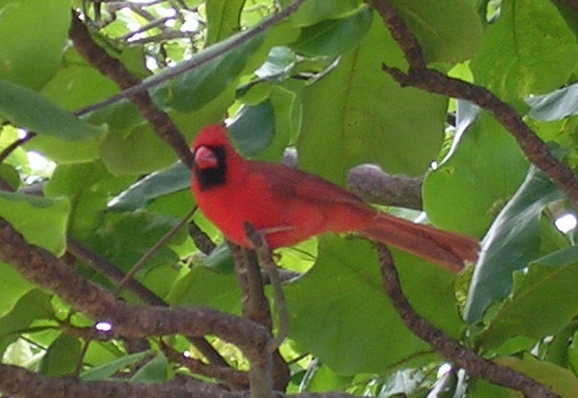
- Cardinal bird in a tree

Color coordinates
- Hex triplet: #C51E3A
- sRGB^{B} (r, g, b): (197, 30, 58)
- HSV (h, s, v): (350°, 85%, 77%)
- CIELCh_{uv} (L, C, h): (43, 120, 8°)
- Source: Maerz and Paul
- ISCC–NBS descriptor: Vivid red
- B: Normalized to [0–255] (byte)

Cardinal red, also called cardinal, is a vivid red, which gets its name from the cassocks worn by cardinals. The bird takes its name from the color.

=== Carmine ===
Carmine
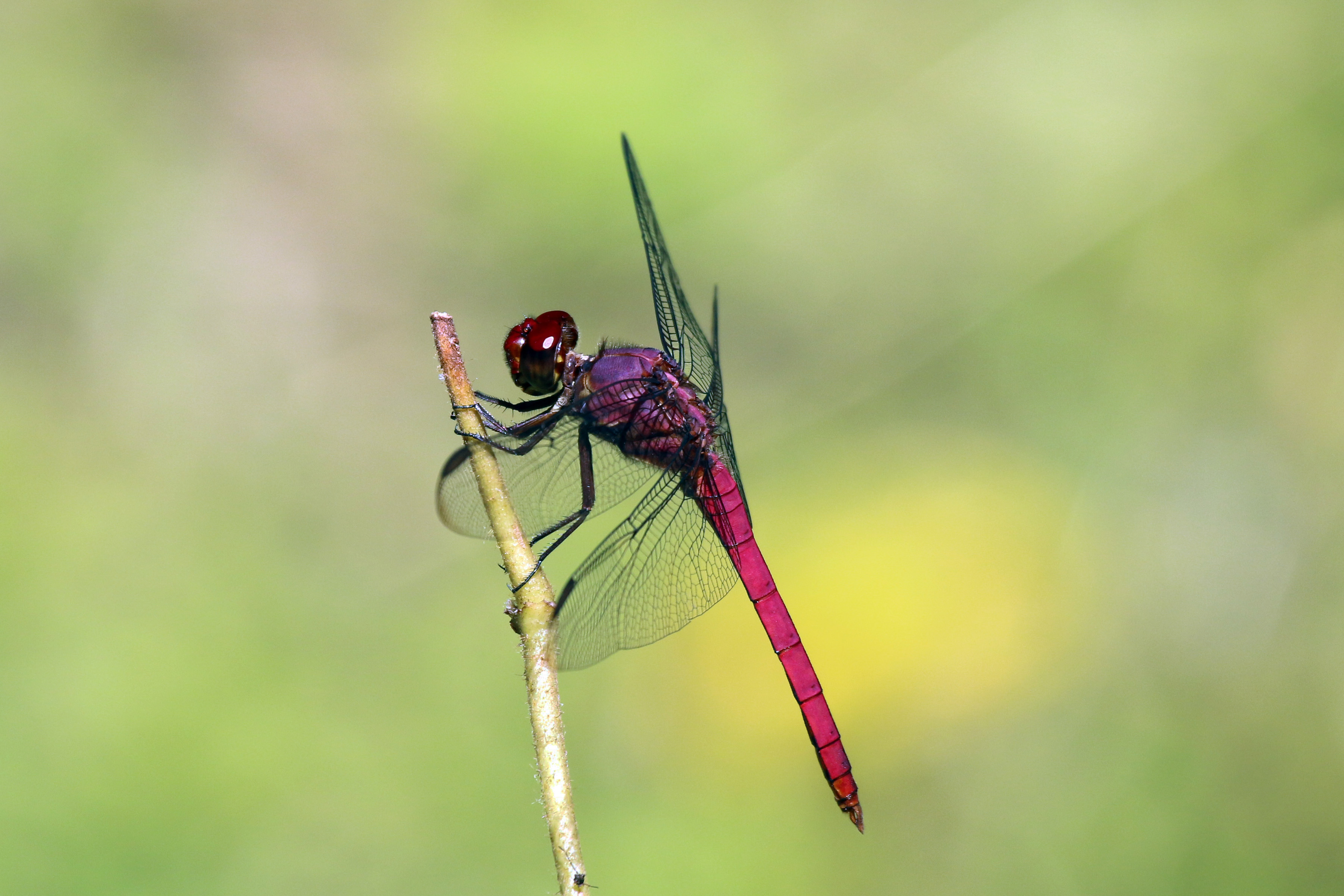
- Carmine skimmer (male)

Color coordinates
- Hex triplet: #960018
- sRGB^{B} (r, g, b): (150, 0, 24)
- HSV (h, s, v): (350°, 100%, 59%)
- CIELCh_{uv} (L, C, h): (31, 99, 10°)
- Source: Pourpre.com
- ISCC–NBS descriptor: Vivid red
- B: Normalized to [0–255] (byte)

The color carmine is a vivid crimson. In its pigment form it mostly contains the red light with wavelengths longer than 600 nm, i.e. it is close to the extreme spectral red. This places it far beyond standard gamuts (both RGB and CMYK), and its given RGB value is a poor approximation only.

=== Chili red ===
Chili red
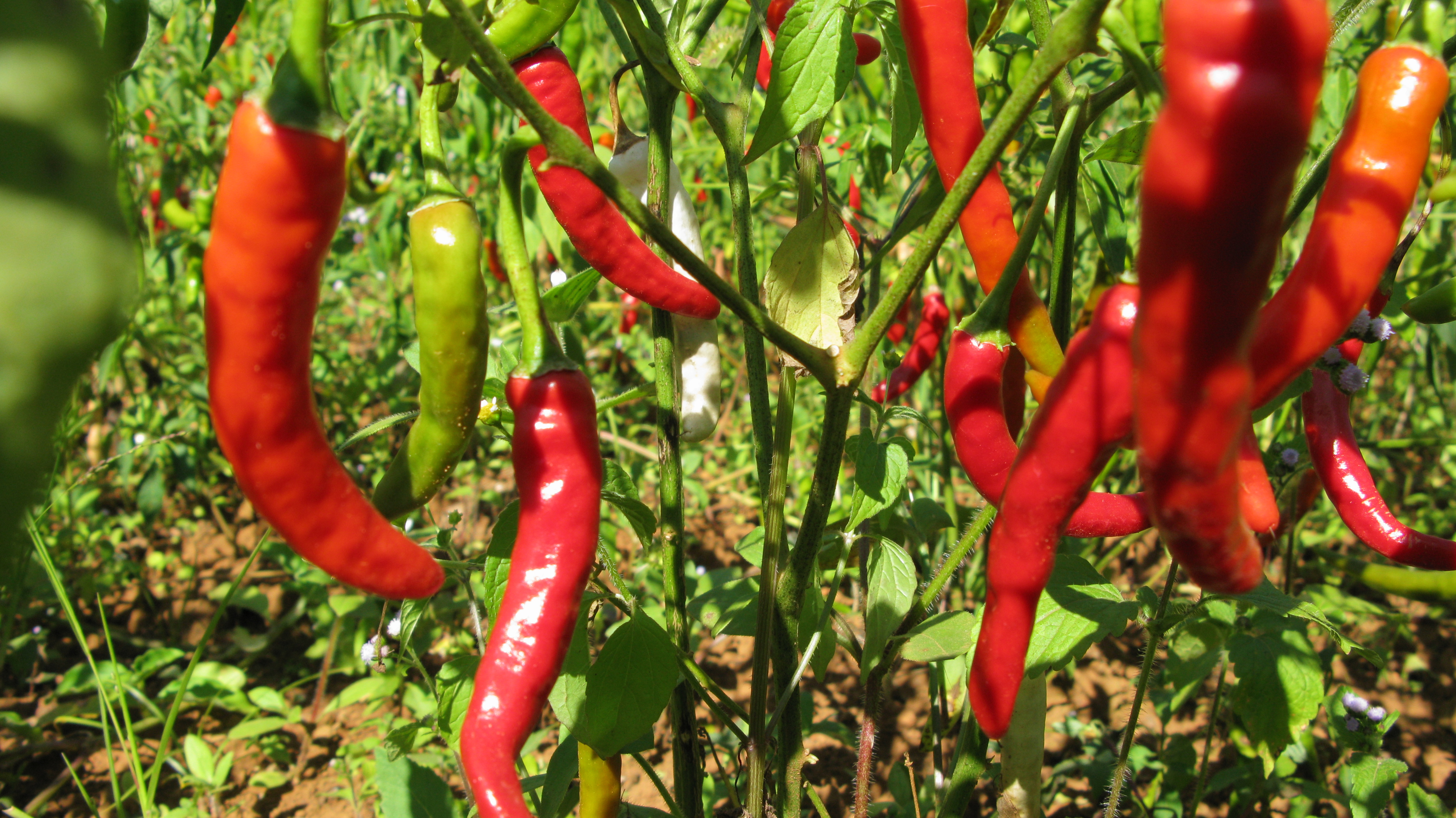
- Burmese chili pepper

Color coordinates
- Hex triplet: #E03C31
- sRGB^{B} (r, g, b): (224, 60, 49)
- HSV (h, s, v): (4°, 78%, 88%)
- CIELCh_{uv} (L, C, h): (51, 132, 14°)
- Source: gov.za
- ISCC–NBS descriptor: Vivid reddish orange
- B: Normalized to [0–255] (byte)

Chili red is the color of red chili peppers. It is the shade of red used in the flags of Chile and South Africa. On the flag of South Africa, it is defined as Pantone 179. National flag | South African Government

=== Chocolate cosmos ===
Chocolate cosmos
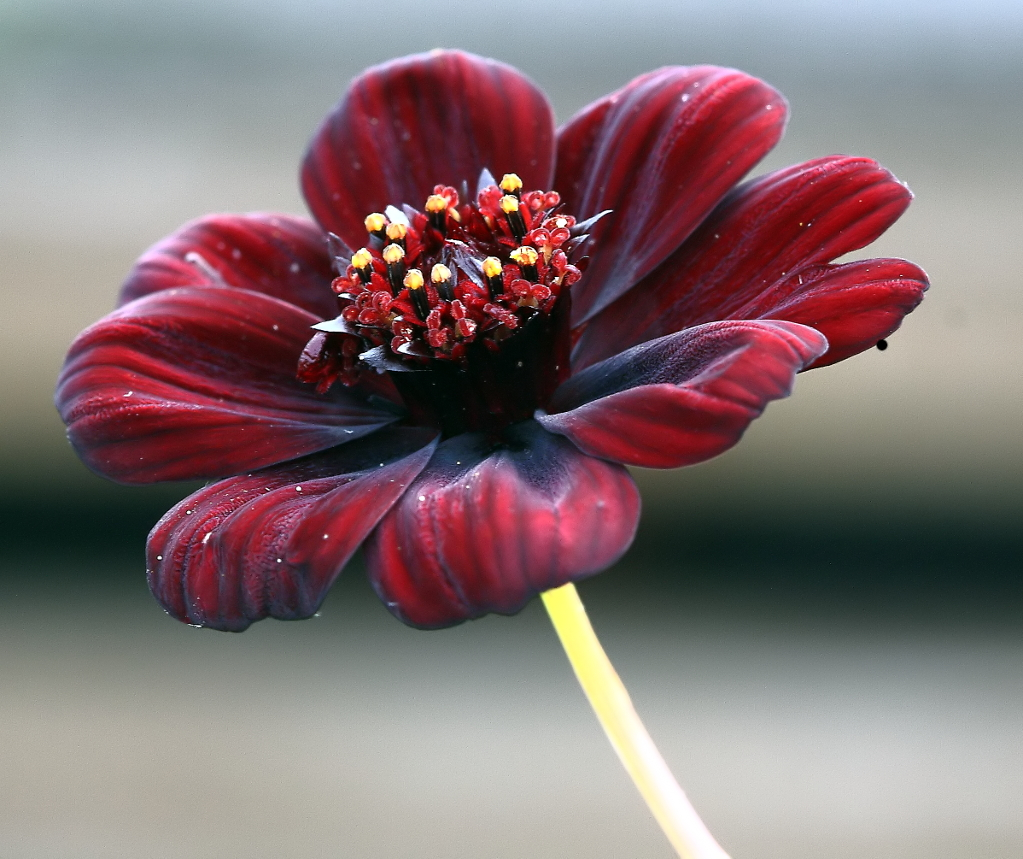
- Chocolate cosmos flower

Color coordinates
- Hex triplet: #58111A
- sRGB^{B} (r, g, b): (88, 17, 26)
- HSV (h, s, v): (352°, 81%, 35%)
- CIELCh_{uv} (L, C, h): (18, 44, 8°)
- ISCC–NBS descriptor: Deep reddish brown
- B: Normalized to [0–255] (byte)

Chocolate cosmos, or red cosmos is the color of Cosmos atrosanguineus species.

The color is described as dark red, deep crimson, deeper burgundy, deep red chocolate, as dark hazelnut and velvety maroon.

=== Cinnabar ===
Cinnabar
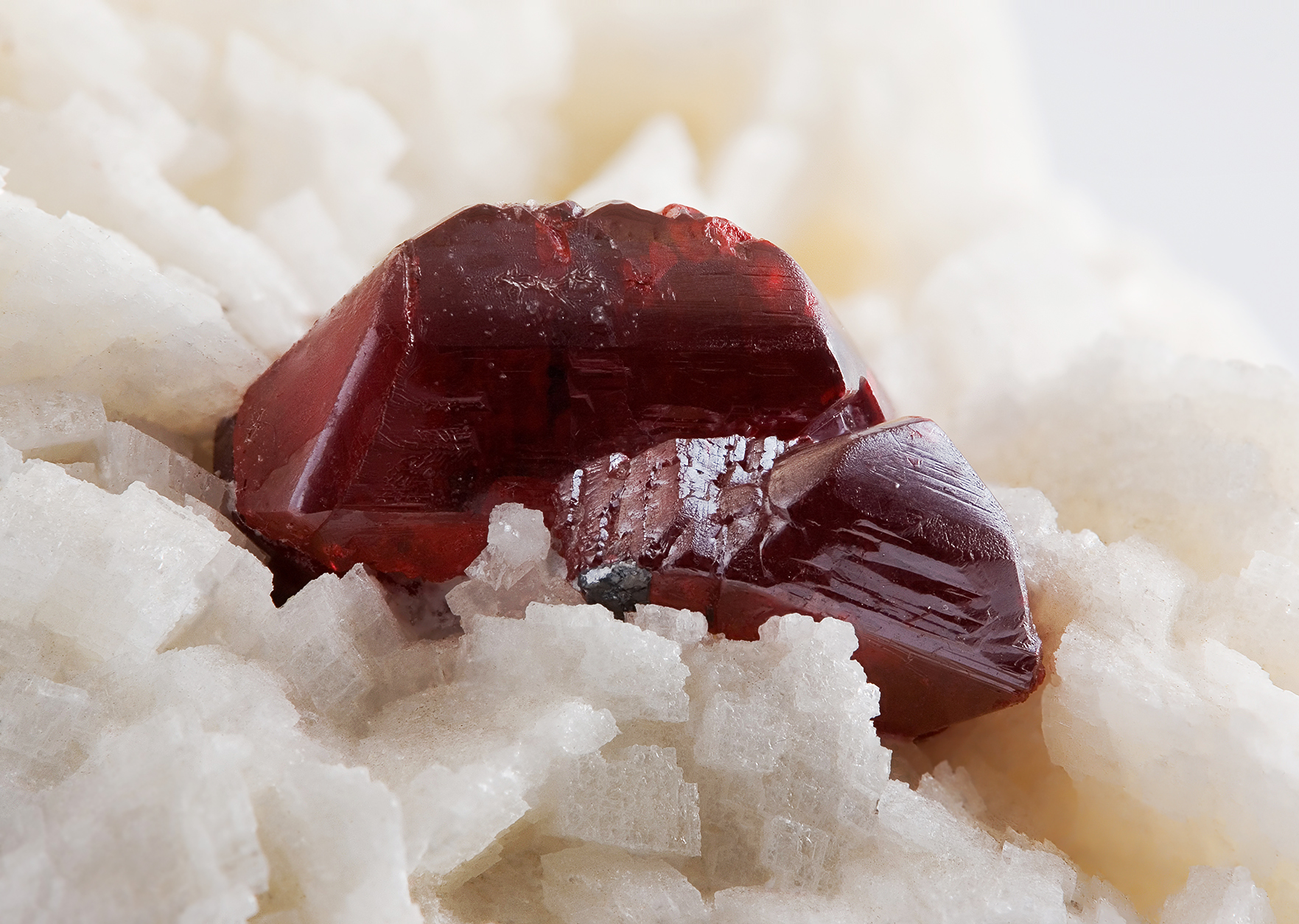
- Cinnabar crystals in dolomite

Color coordinates
- Hex triplet: #E44D2E
- sRGB^{B} (r, g, b): (228, 77, 46)
- HSV (h, s, v): (10°, 80%, 89%)
- CIELCh_{uv} (L, C, h): (54, 126, 17°)
- Source: Thom Poole's 2017 book Life of Colour
- ISCC–NBS descriptor: Vivid reddish orange
- B: Normalized to [0–255] (byte)

The color cinnabar derives from the mineral of the same name. It is a slightly orange shade of red, with variations ranging from bright scarlet to brick red.

=== Coral pink ===
Coral pink
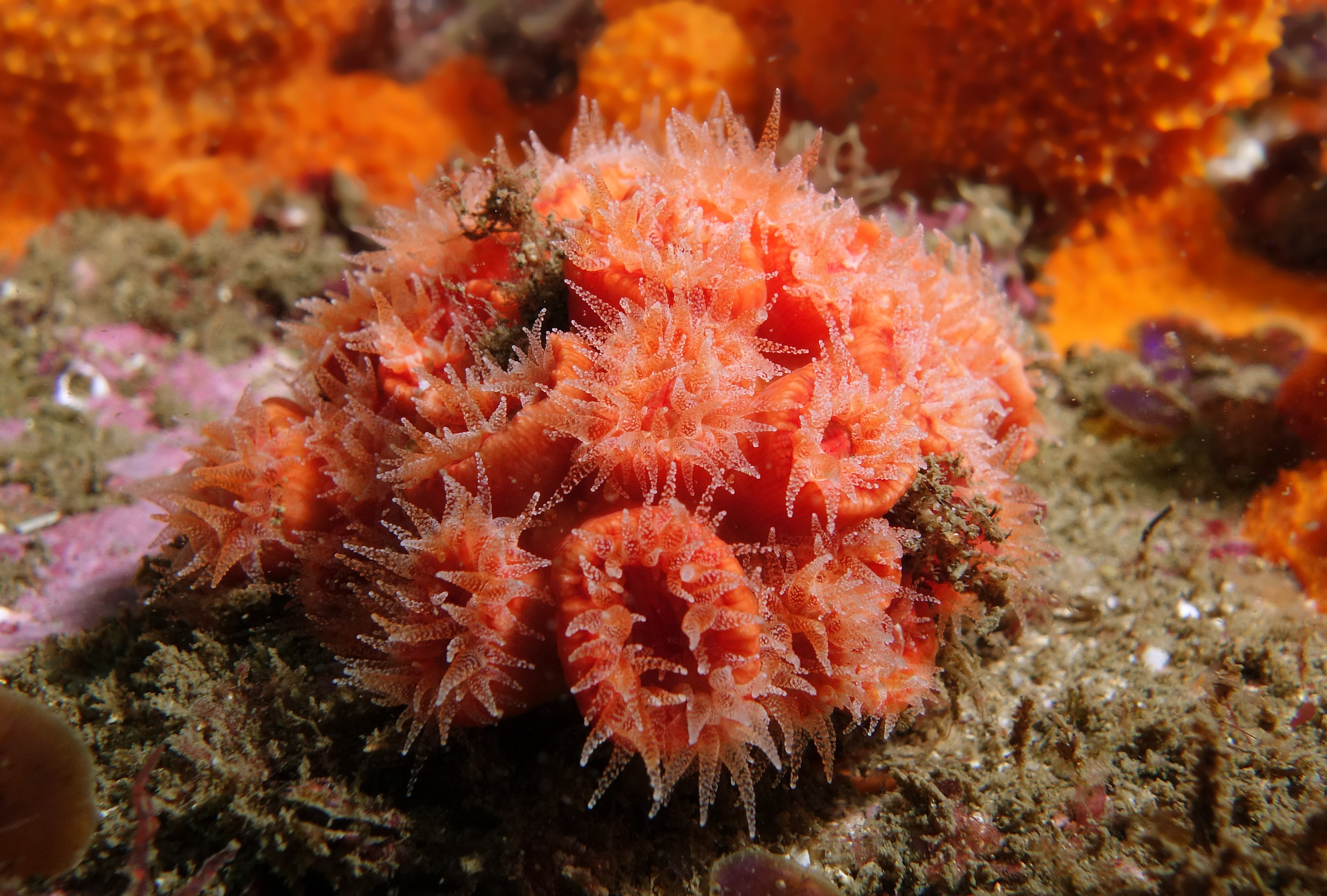
- Coral

Color coordinates
- Hex triplet: #F88379
- sRGB^{B} (r, g, b): (248, 131, 121)
- HSV (h, s, v): (5°, 51%, 97%)
- CIELCh_{uv} (L, C, h): (68, 89, 16°)
- Source: ISCC-NBS
- ISCC–NBS descriptor: Deep yellowish red
- B: Normalized to [0–255] (byte)

The color coral pink is a pinkish color.

The first recorded use of coral pink as a color name in English was in 1892. Late in 2016, the color sample was renamed Coral Red by Pantone, as the RGB, Hex and HTML color table showed the same color as being reddish, standing against popular belief of pinkish.

Still today, some people call Coral Red as Coral Pink due to this old attribution.

The complementary color of coral pink is teal.

=== Cordovan ===
Cordovan

Color coordinates
- Hex triplet: #893F45
- sRGB^{B} (r, g, b): (137, 63, 69)
- HSV (h, s, v): (355°, 54%, 54%)
- CIELCh_{uv} (L, C, h): (37, 51, 8°)
- Source: Pantone Color Planner
- ISCC–NBS descriptor: Dark red
- B: Normalized to [0–255] (byte)

Cordovan is a rich medium dark shade of red.

The first recorded use of cordovan as a color name in English was in 1925.

=== Crimson ===
Crimson
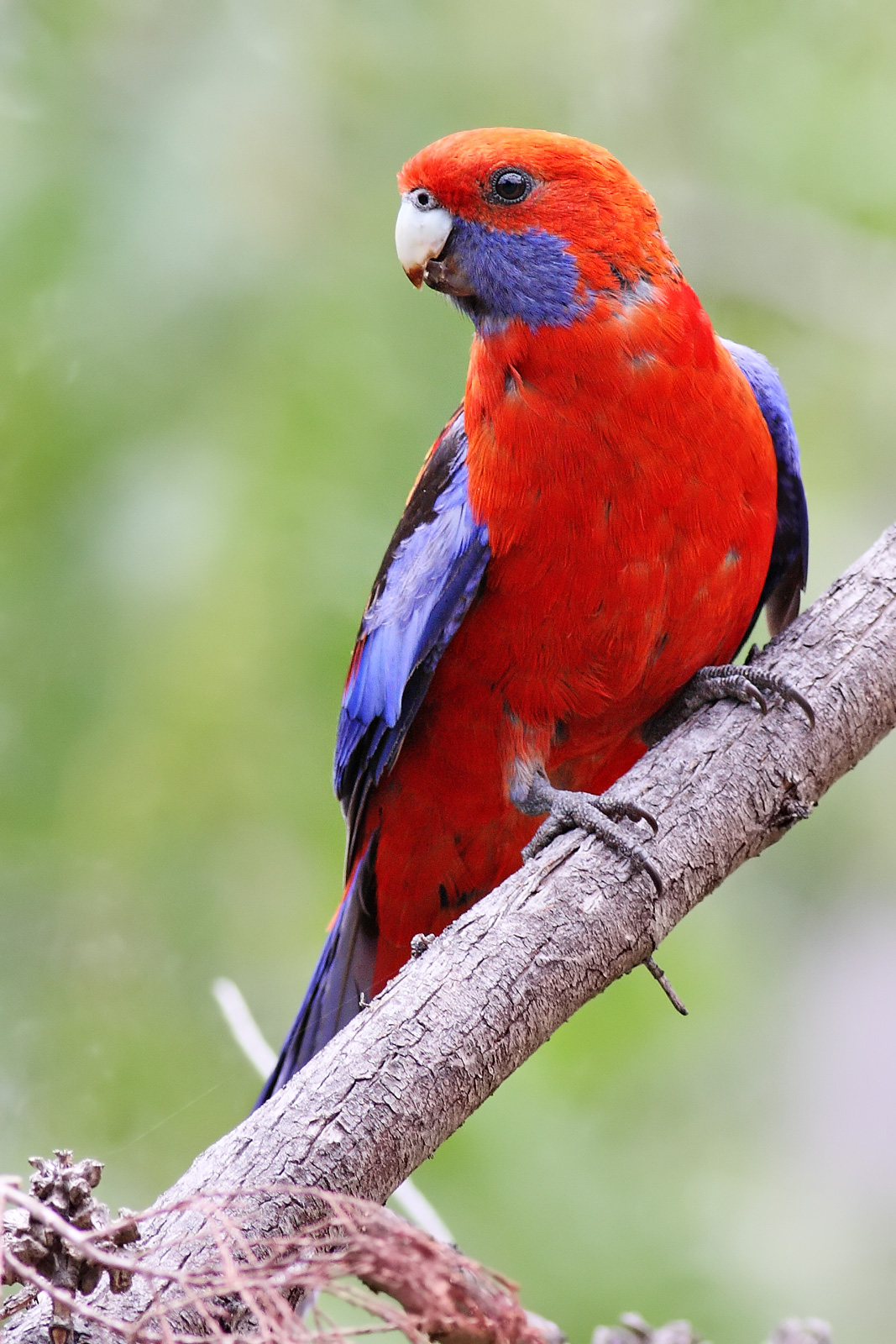
- Crimson rosella

Color coordinates
- Hex triplet: #DC143C
- sRGB^{B} (r, g, b): (220, 20, 60)
- HSV (h, s, v): (348°, 91%, 86%)
- CIELCh_{uv} (L, C, h): (47, 140, 8°)
- Source: X11
- ISCC–NBS descriptor: Vivid red
- B: Normalized to [0–255] (byte)

Crimson is a strong, bright, deep red color combined with some blue or violet, resulting in a small degree of purple. It is also the color between rose and red on the RGB color wheel and magenta and red on the RYB color wheel.

=== Cunard red ===
Cunard red

Color coordinates
- Hex triplet: #E42313
- sRGB^{B} (r, g, b): (228, 35, 19)
- HSV (h, s, v): (5°, 92%, 89%)
- CIELCh_{uv} (L, C, h): (49, 151, 13°)
- ISCC–NBS descriptor: Red-orange
- B: Normalized to [0–255] (byte)

When the British shipping line Cunard was launched, a red funnel colour was selected to identify the company's ships. However, the heat from the funnels caused the paint to peel. To stop this, the red paint was thickened and mixed with buttermilk. When the heat of the funnel interacted with the buttermilk within the mixture, however, the red paint changed in colour and became a distinctive red-orange. This shade of red became known as Cunard Red.

=== Cymbidium red ===
Cymbidium red

Color coordinates
- Hex triplet: #D5373A
- sRGB^{B} (r, g, b): (213, 55, 58)
- HSV (h, s, v): (359°, 74%, 84%)
- CIELCh_{uv} (L, C, h): (48, 123, 12°)
- Source: ColorHexa
- ISCC–NBS descriptor: Vivid red
- B: Normalized to [0–255] (byte)

The color cymbidium red is a nuance of red Cymbidium flower specie. Cymbidium red is a vivid red, look like jasper color.

=== Dark red ===
Dark red

Color coordinates
- Hex triplet: #8B0000
- sRGB^{B} (r, g, b): (139, 0, 0)
- HSV (h, s, v): (0°, 100%, 55%)
- CIELCh_{uv} (L, C, h): (28, 94, 12°)
- Source: X11
- ISCC–NBS descriptor: Strong reddish brown
- B: Normalized to [0–255] (byte)

This is the web color dark red.

=== Fire brick ===
Fire brick

Color coordinates
- Hex triplet: #B22222
- sRGB^{B} (r, g, b): (178, 34, 34)
- HSV (h, s, v): (0°, 81%, 70%)
- CIELCh_{uv} (L, C, h): (39, 110, 12°)
- Source: X11
- ISCC–NBS descriptor: Vivid red
- B: Normalized to [0–255] (byte)

This is the web color fire brick.

=== Fire engine red ===
Fire engine red
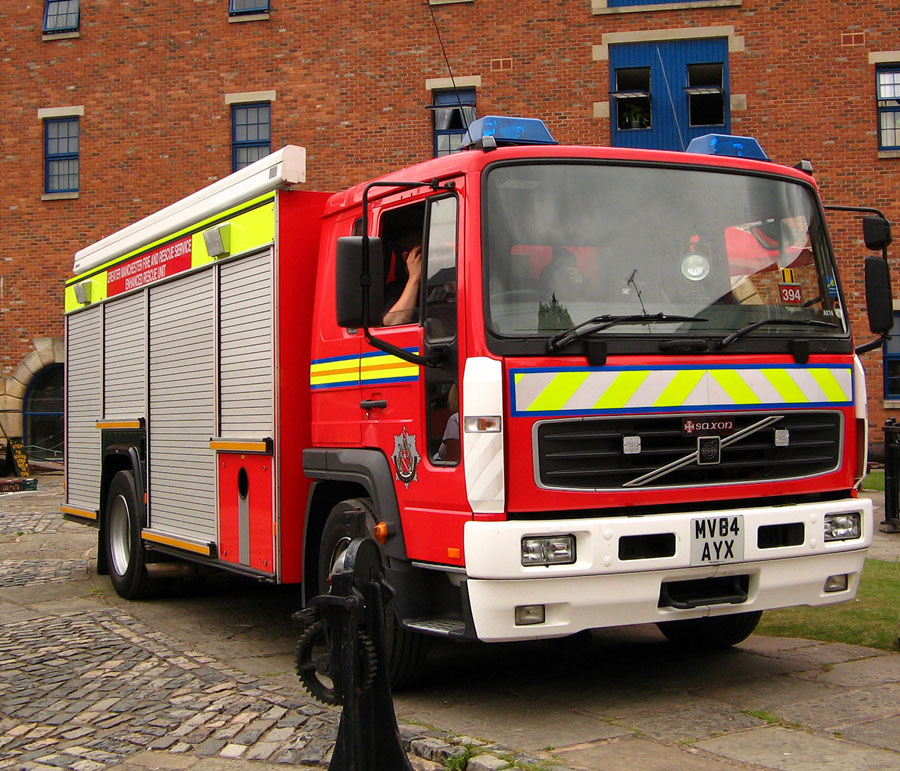
- A fire engine of the Greater Manchester Fire and Rescue Service.

Color coordinates
- Hex triplet: #CE2029
- sRGB^{B} (r, g, b): (206, 32, 41)
- HSV (h, s, v): (357°, 84%, 81%)
- CIELCh_{uv} (L, C, h): (45, 131, 11°)
- ISCC–NBS descriptor: Vivid red
- B: Normalized to [0–255] (byte)

Fire engine red is an intense, bright red commonly used on emergency vehicles; mostly on fire engines, other associated fire service vehicles, and ambulances.

=== Fluorescent red ===
Fluorescent red

Color coordinates
- Hex triplet: #FF2226
- sRGB^{B} (r, g, b): (255, 34, 38)
- HSV (h, s, v): (359°, 87%, 100%)
- CIELCh_{uv} (L, C, h): (55, 168, 12°)
- Source: color-name.com
- ISCC–NBS descriptor: Vivid reddish orange
- B: Normalized to [0–255] (byte)

Fluorescent red is a light brilliant red color.

=== Garnet ===
Garnet
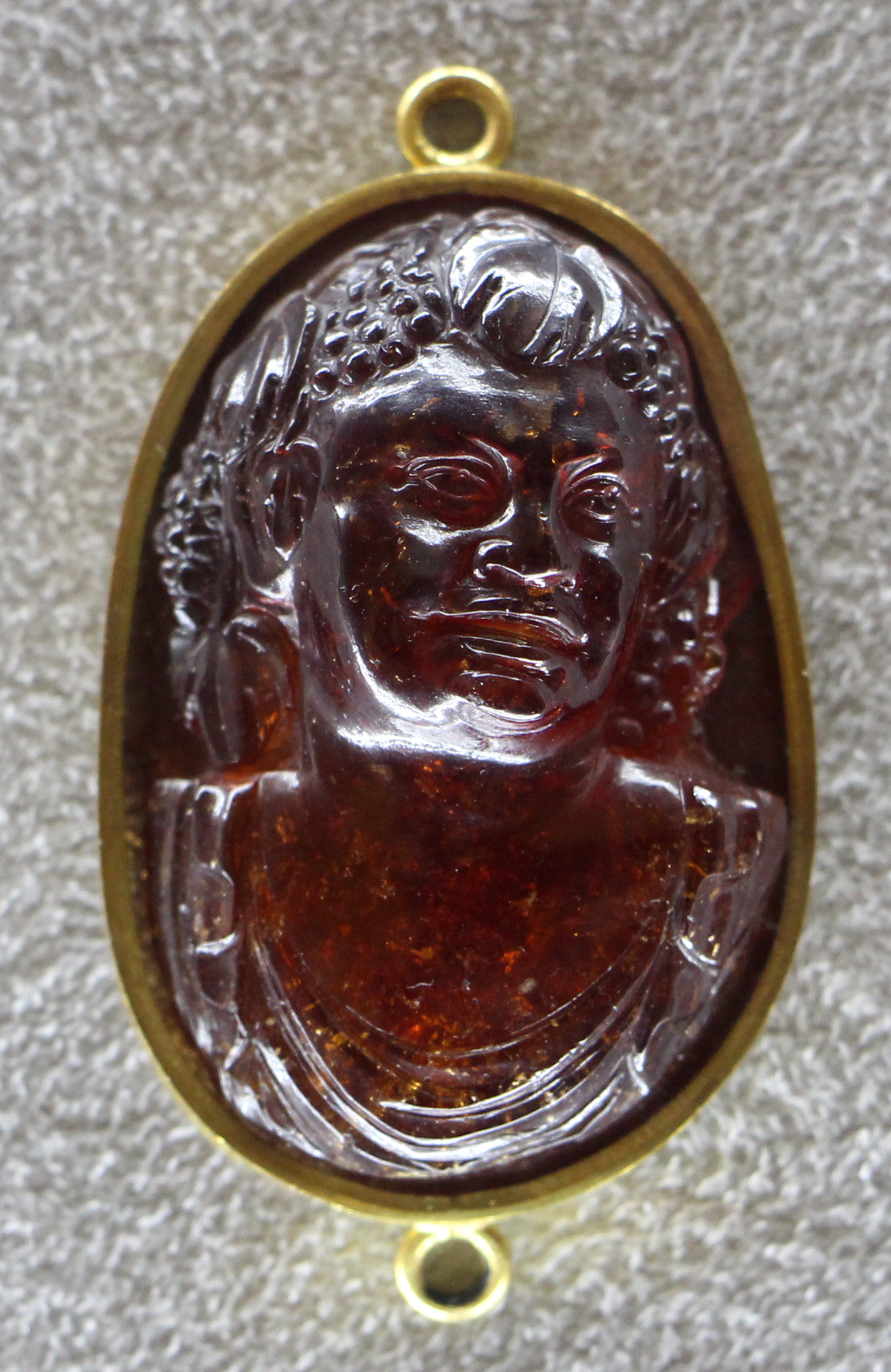
- Garnet jewelry

Color coordinates
- Hex triplet: #733635
- sRGB^{B} (r, g, b): (115, 54, 53)
- HSV (h, s, v): (1°, 54%, 45%)
- CIELCh_{uv} (L, C, h): (31, 43, 13°)
- Source: Encycolorpedia
- ISCC–NBS descriptor: Deep reddish brown
- B: Normalized to [0–255] (byte)

The color garnet can be considered a dark tone of red, with some slight purple tints.

This color represents the hue of an average garnet gemstone, though garnets can range in color from orange to (very rarely) green.

=== Imperial red ===
Imperial red
- Imperial standard of Napoleon I

Color coordinates
- Hex triplet: #ED2939
- sRGB^{B} (r, g, b): (237, 41, 57)
- HSV (h, s, v): (355°, 83%, 93%)
- CIELCh_{uv} (L, C, h): (52, 148, 10°)
- Source: Vexillological
- ISCC–NBS descriptor: Vivid red
- B: Normalized to [0–255] (byte)

Imperial red is a representation of the red color of the Imperial Standard of Napoleon I.

The first recorded use of imperial red as a color name in English was in 1914. Note: the RGB values for Pantone red and imperial red are identical.

=== Indian red ===
Indian Red

Color coordinates
- Hex triplet: #CD5C5C
- sRGB^{B} (r, g, b): (205, 92, 92)
- HSV (h, s, v): (0°, 55%, 80%)
- CIELCh_{uv} (L, C, h): (53, 85, 12°)
- Source: X11
- ISCC–NBS descriptor: Moderate red
- B: Normalized to [0–255] (byte)

The name Indian red derives from the red laterite soil found in India, which is composed of naturally occurring iron oxides. The first recorded use of "Indian red" as a color term in English was in 1792.

=== Jasper ===
Jasper
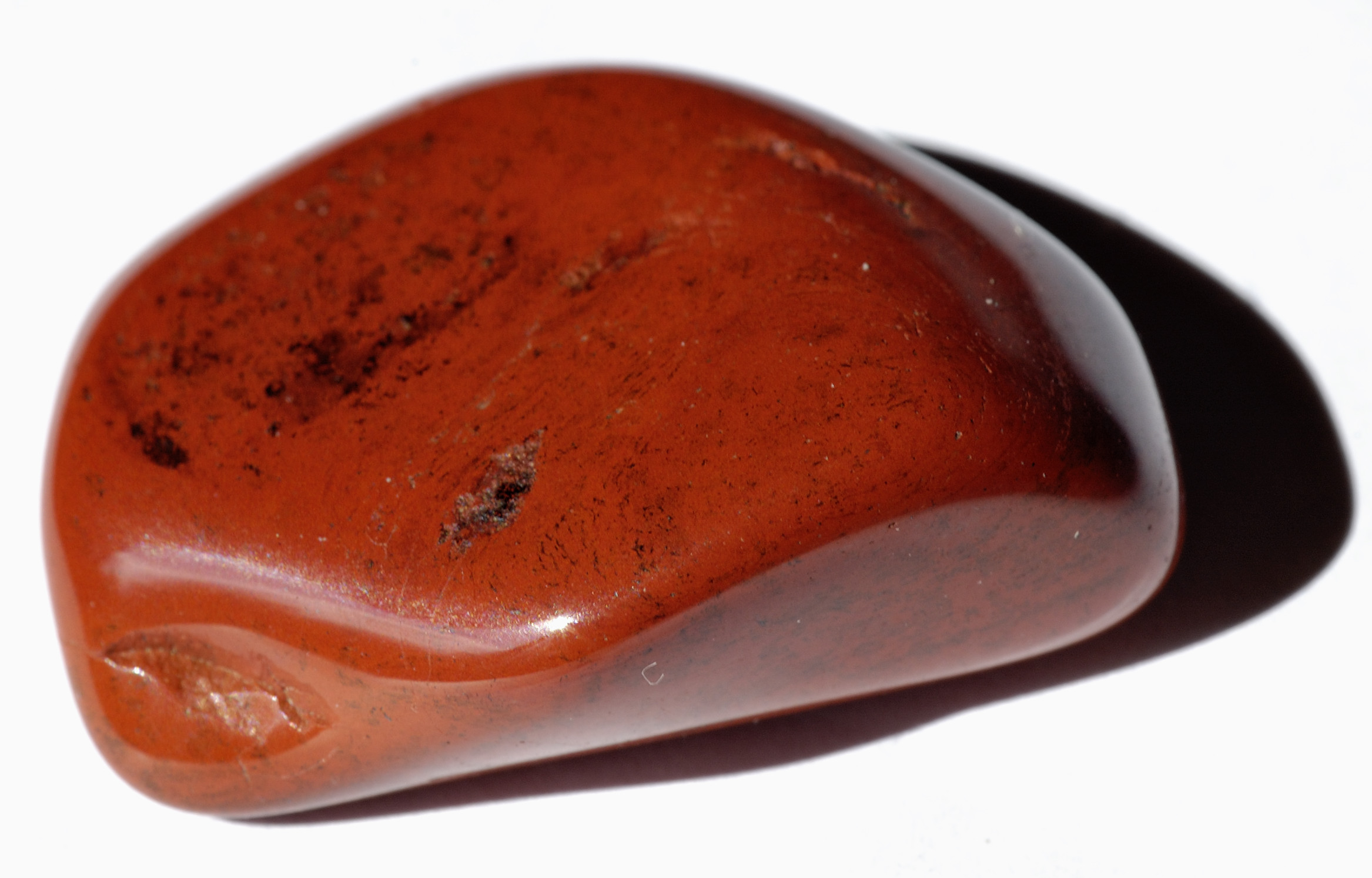
- Polished red jasper

Color coordinates
- Hex triplet: #D05340
- sRGB^{B} (r, g, b): (208, 83, 64)
- HSV (h, s, v): (8°, 69%, 82%)
- CIELCh_{uv} (L, C, h): (52, 102, 17°)
- Source: Crayola
- ISCC–NBS descriptor: Strong reddish orange
- B: Normalized to [0–255] (byte)

The color jasper is named for red jasper, the most commonly known form of jasper; however, as with many gemstones, jasper can be found in many colors, from yellow to brown and even green. The color was formulated by Crayola in 1994 as part of their Gem Tones crayon set.

=== Light coral ===
Light coral

Color coordinates
- Hex triplet: #F08080
- sRGB^{B} (r, g, b): (240, 128, 128)
- HSV (h, s, v): (0°, 47%, 94%)
- CIELCh_{uv} (L, C, h): (66, 82, 12°)
- Source: HTML/CSS; X11 color names
- ISCC–NBS descriptor: Deep pink
- B: Normalized to [0–255] (byte)

The web color light coral is a pinkish-light orange color. It is also a HTML/CSS color name and a X11 color name.

=== Light red ===
Light red

Color coordinates
- Hex triplet: #FF8080
- sRGB^{B} (r, g, b): (255, 128, 128)
- HSV (h, s, v): (0°, 50%, 100%)
- CIELCh_{uv} (L, C, h): (68, 94, 12°)
- Source: X11 color names HTML/CSS
- ISCC–NBS descriptor: Vivid yellowish pink
- B: Normalized to [0–255] (byte)

The color light red, though very similar to pink, is a shade of red that is roughly 50% lighter than red.

=== Lust ===
Lust

Color coordinates
- Hex triplet: #E62020
- sRGB^{B} (r, g, b): (230, 32, 32)
- HSV (h, s, v): (0°, 86%, 90%)
- CIELCh_{uv} (L, C, h): (49, 152, 12°)
- Source: ISCC-NBS
- ISCC–NBS descriptor: Vivid reddish orange
- B: Normalized to [0–255] (byte)

Lust is a rich shade of red.

This color is not mentioned in the 1930 book A Dictionary of Color by Maerz and Paul but is found on the 1955 ISCC-NBS color list.

=== Madder ===
Madder

Color coordinates
- Hex triplet: #A50021
- sRGB^{B} (r, g, b): (165, 0, 33)
- HSV (h, s, v): (348°, 100%, 65%)
- CIELCh_{uv} (L, C, h): (34, 109, 9°)
- ISCC–NBS descriptor: Vivid red
- B: Normalized to [0–255] (byte)

The color madder is named for a dye produced from plants of the genus Rubia.

=== Maroon (HTML/CSS) ===
Maroon

Color coordinates
- Hex triplet: #800000
- sRGB^{B} (r, g, b): (128, 0, 0)
- HSV (h, s, v): (0°, 100%, 50%)
- CIELCh_{uv} (L, C, h): (26, 86, 12°)
- Source: HTML/CSS
- ISCC–NBS descriptor: Deep reddish brown
- B: Normalized to [0–255] (byte)

This is the web color called maroon in HTML/CSS. It only consists of red in RGB and no cyan in CMYK.

=== Misty rose ===
Misty rose

Color coordinates
- Hex triplet: #FFE4E1
- sRGB^{B} (r, g, b): (255, 228, 225)
- HSV (h, s, v): (6°, 12%, 100%)
- CIELCh_{uv} (L, C, h): (93, 17, 19°)
- Source: X11
- ISCC–NBS descriptor: Pale yellowish pink
- B: Normalized to [0–255] (byte)

The web color misty rose is written as mistyrose in HTML code for computer display.

The color name misty rose first came into use in 1987, when this color was formulated as one of the X11 colors, which in the early 1990s became known as the X11 web colors.

=== Old rose ===
Old rose

Color coordinates
- Hex triplet: #C08081
- sRGB^{B} (r, g, b): (192, 128, 129)
- HSV (h, s, v): (359°, 33%, 75%)
- CIELCh_{uv} (L, C, h): (60, 43, 11°)
- Source: ISCC-NBS
- ISCC–NBS descriptor: Dark pink
- B: Normalized to [0–255] (byte)

The color old rose, also known as ashes of rose, was a popular Victorian color, it is a dullish red. The first recorded use of old rose as a color name in English was in 1892.

=== Pink ===
Pink

Color coordinates
- Hex triplet: #FFC0CB
- sRGB^{B} (r, g, b): (255, 192, 203)
- HSV (h, s, v): (350°, 25%, 100%)
- CIELCh_{uv} (L, C, h): (84, 39, 1°)
- Source: X11 color names HTML/CSS
- ISCC–NBS descriptor: Strong pink
- B: Normalized to [0–255] (byte)

The web color pink is a light tint of red, but is often considered to be a basic color term on its own.

=== Poppy red ===
Poppy red
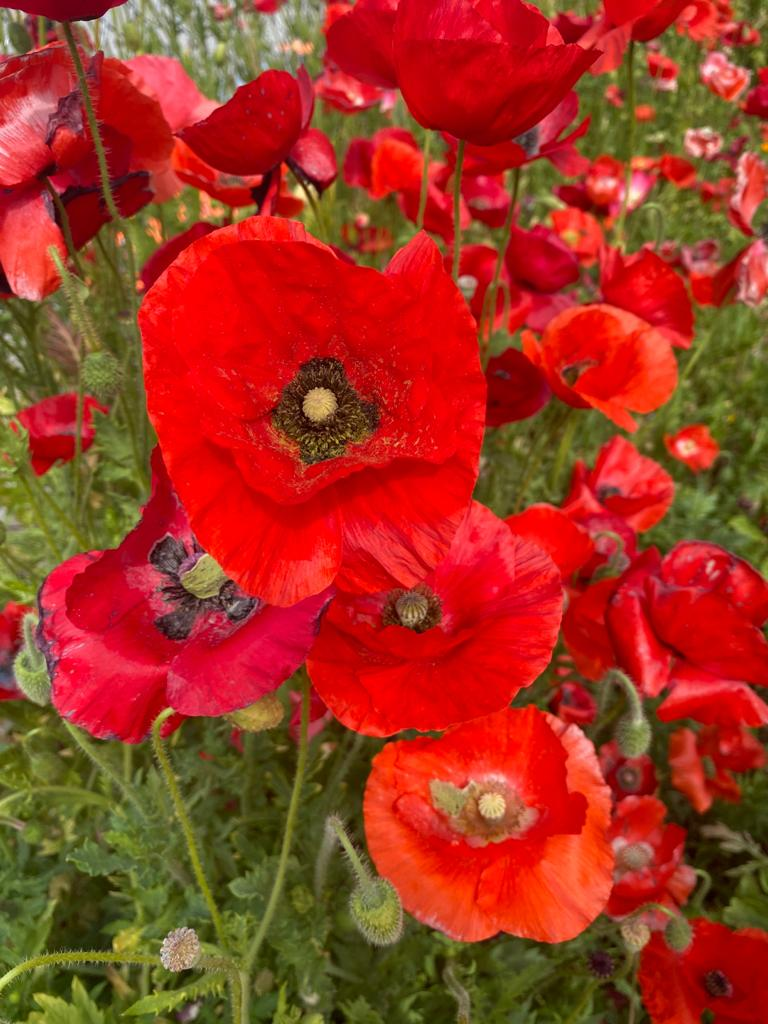
- Poppy flower

Color coordinates
- Hex triplet: #DC343B
- sRGB^{B} (r, g, b): (220, 52, 59)
- HSV (h, s, v): (358°, 76%, 86%)
- CIELCh_{uv} (L, C, h): (49, 129, 11°)
- Source: color-name.com
- ISCC–NBS descriptor: Vivid red
- B: Normalized to [0–255] (byte)

The color poppy red is named after the poppy flower.

Poppy red is a shade of pink-red. Lieutenant-Colonel John McCrae, a Canadian officer and surgeon in World War I, wrote possibly history's most famous wartime poem, called "In Flanders Fields", written in 1915. It helped the poppy (Papaver rhoeas) become a symbol of remembrance for soldiers who have died during the conflict and later conflicts.

=== Redwood ===
Redwood
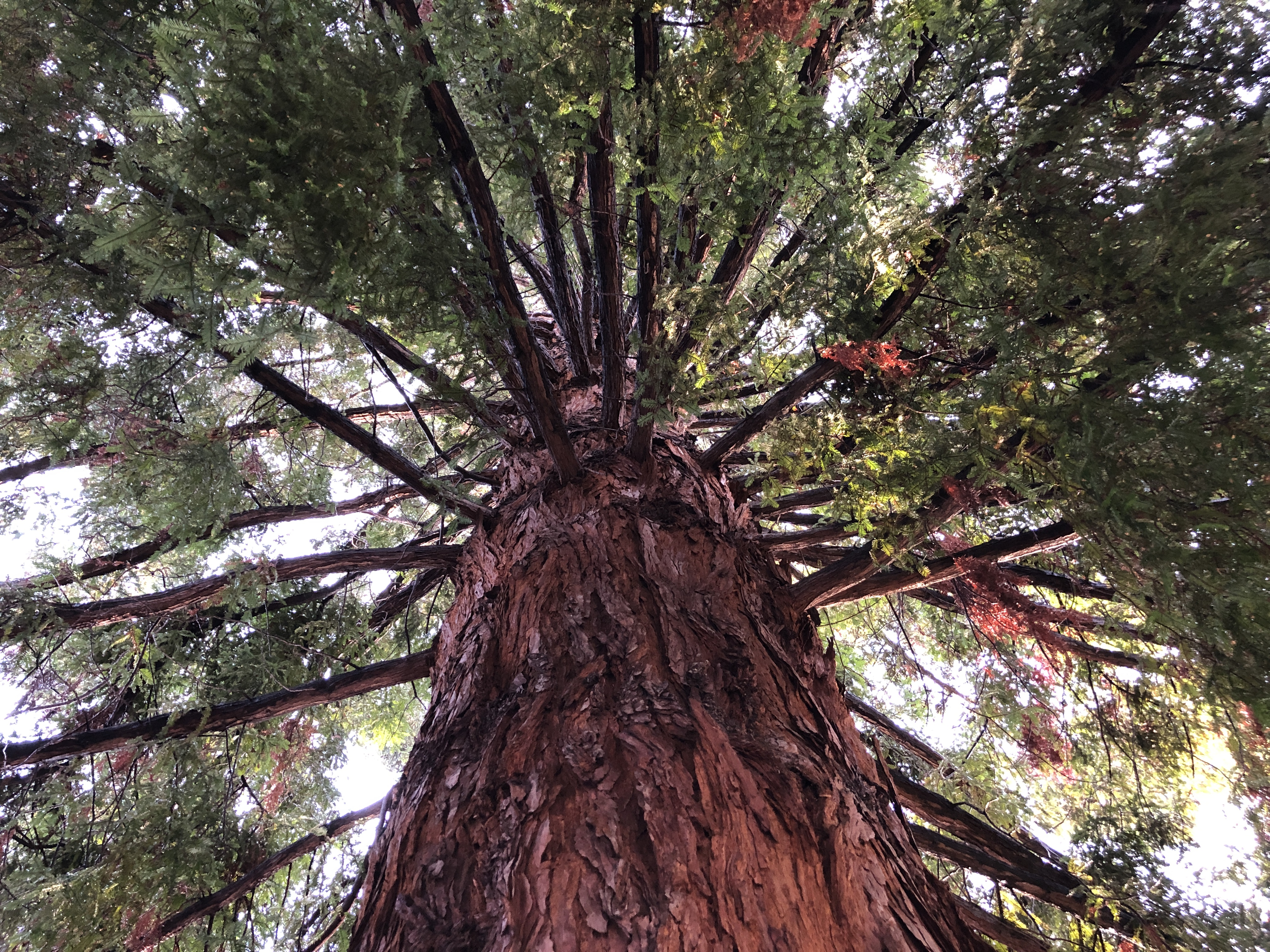
- A redwood tree

Color coordinates
- Hex triplet: #A45953
- sRGB^{B} (r, g, b): (164, 89, 83)
- HSV (h, s, v): (4°, 49%, 64%)
- CIELCh_{uv} (L, C, h): (47, 56, 16°)
- Source: Pantone TPX
- ISCC–NBS descriptor: Dark reddish orange
- B: Normalized to [0–255] (byte)

The color redwood is a representation of color of the wood of the redwood tree (Sequoia sempervirens).

The first recorded use of redwood as a color name in English was in 1917.

The source of this color is the Pantone Textile Paper eXtended (TPX) color list, color #18-1443—Redwood.

=== Rose ebony ===
Rose ebony

Color coordinates
- Hex triplet: #674846
- sRGB^{B} (r, g, b): (103, 72, 70)
- HSV (h, s, v): (4°, 32%, 40%)
- CIELCh_{uv} (L, C, h): (34, 20, 16°)
- Source: ISCC-NBS
- ISCC–NBS descriptor: Grayish reddish brown
- B: Normalized to [0–255] (byte)

The first recorded use of rose ebony as a color name in English was in 1924.

=== Rose taupe ===
Rose taupe

Color coordinates
- Hex triplet: #905D5D
- sRGB^{B} (r, g, b): (144, 93, 93)
- HSV (h, s, v): (0°, 35%, 56%)
- CIELCh_{uv} (L, C, h): (45, 34, 12°)
- Source: ISCC-NBS
- ISCC–NBS descriptor: Grayish red
- B: Normalized to [0–255] (byte)

The first recorded use of rose taupe as a color name in English was in 1924.

=== Rose vale ===
Rose vale

Color coordinates
- Hex triplet: #AB4E52
- sRGB^{B} (r, g, b): (171, 78, 82)
- HSV (h, s, v): (357°, 54%, 67%)
- CIELCh_{uv} (L, C, h): (45, 67, 10°)
- Source: ISCC-NBS
- ISCC–NBS descriptor: Moderate red
- B: Normalized to [0–255] (byte)

The first recorded use of rose vale as a color name in English was in 1923.

=== Rosewood ===
Rosewood
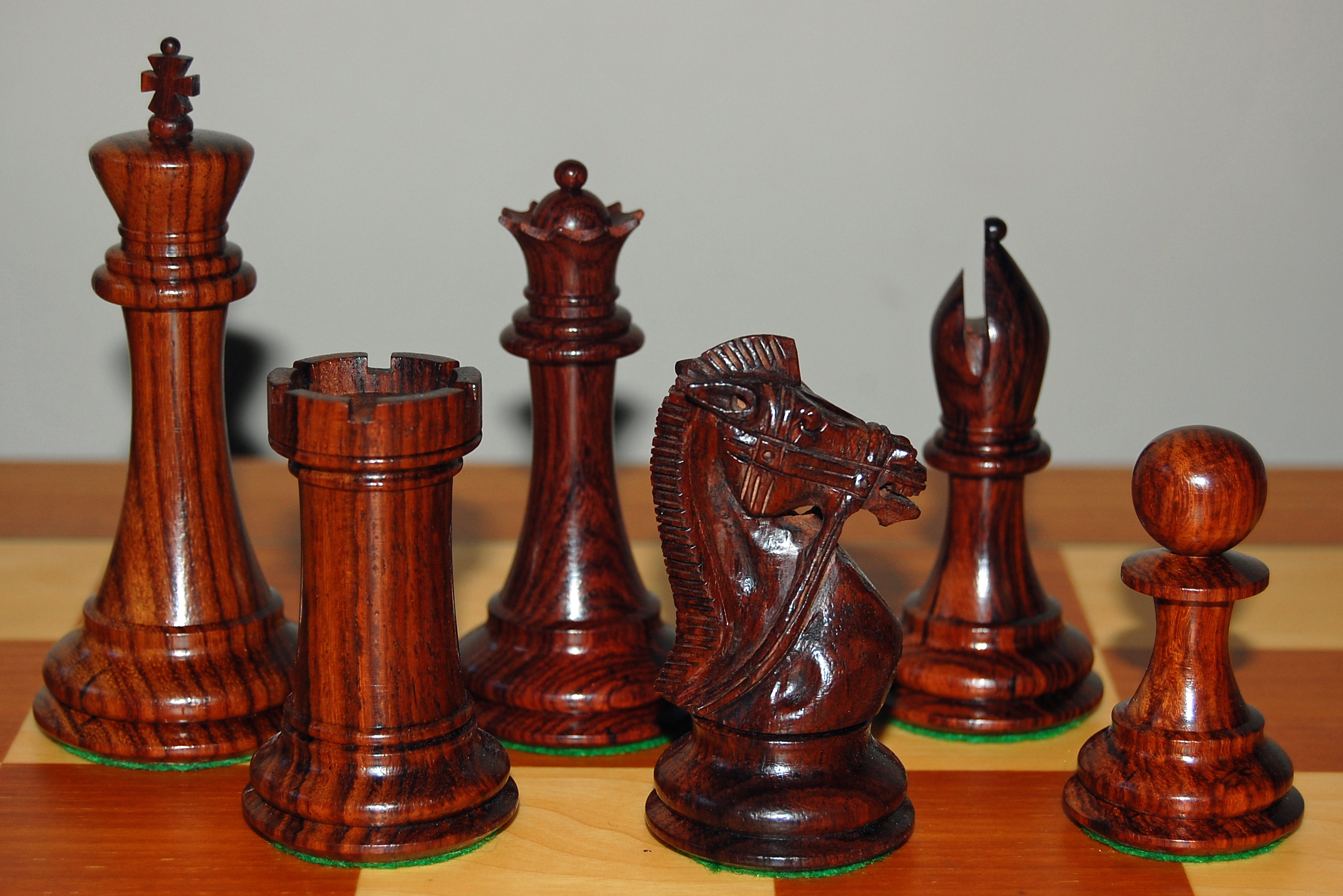
- Rosewood chess pieces

Color coordinates
- Hex triplet: #65000B
- sRGB^{B} (r, g, b): (101, 0, 11)
- HSV (h, s, v): (353°, 100%, 40%)
- CIELCh_{uv} (L, C, h): (19, 62, 10°)
- Source: ColorHexa
- ISCC–NBS descriptor: Deep reddish brown
- B: Normalized to [0–255] (byte)

The color rosewood is named after rosewood.

The first recorded use of rosewood as a color name in English was in 1892. Actual rosewood exhibits a wide range of colors.

=== Rosy brown ===
Rosy brown

Color coordinates
- Hex triplet: #BC8F8F
- sRGB^{B} (r, g, b): (188, 143, 143)
- HSV (h, s, v): (0°, 24%, 74%)
- CIELCh_{uv} (L, C, h): (64, 29, 12°)
- Source: X11
- ISCC–NBS descriptor: Light grayish red
- B: Normalized to [0–255] (byte)

The name for the web color rosy brown first came into use in 1987, when this color was formulated as one of the X11 colors, which in the early 1990s became known as the X11 web colors.

=== Rusty red ===
Rusty red

Color coordinates
- Hex triplet: #DA2C43
- sRGB^{B} (r, g, b): (218, 44, 67)
- HSV (h, s, v): (352°, 80%, 85%)
- CIELCh_{uv} (L, C, h): (48, 128, 9°)
- Source: Crayola
- ISCC–NBS descriptor: Vivid red
- B: Normalized to [0–255] (byte)

Rusty red is a color formulated by Crayola in 1990 as one of the colors in its Silver Swirls specialty crayon box of metallic colors.

=== Salmon ===
Salmon
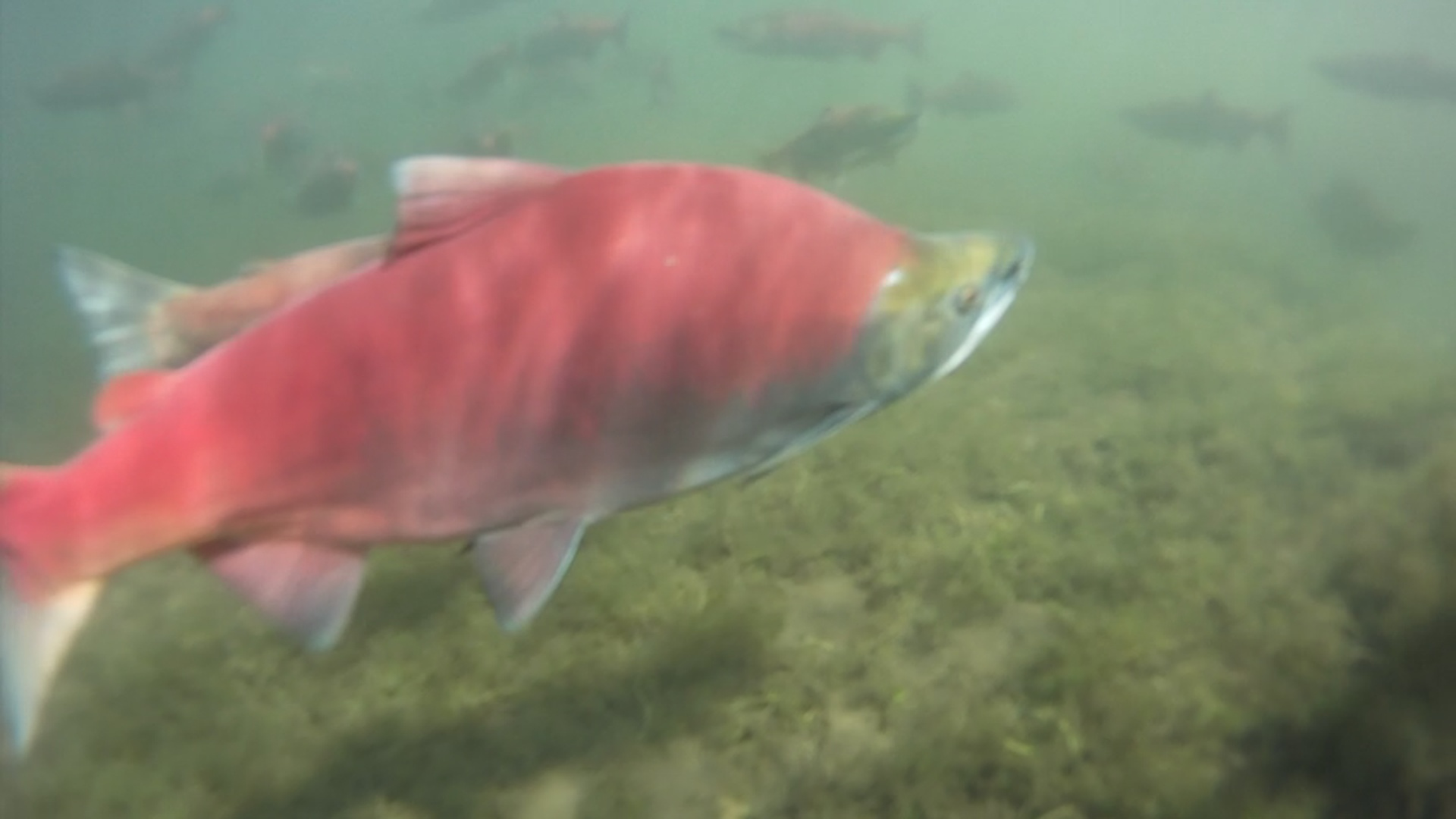
- Sockeye male salmon

Color coordinates
- Hex triplet: #FA8072
- sRGB^{B} (r, g, b): (250, 128, 114)
- HSV (h, s, v): (6°, 54%, 98%)
- CIELCh_{uv} (L, C, h): (67, 95, 17°)
- Source: X11
- ISCC–NBS descriptor: Strong reddish orange
- B: Normalized to [0–255] (byte)

The web color salmon represents the color of the flesh of an average salmon. However, actual salmon flesh can range in hue from a light pinkish-orange to a bright red (as is the case with sockeye salmon).

=== Salmon pink ===
Salmon Pink
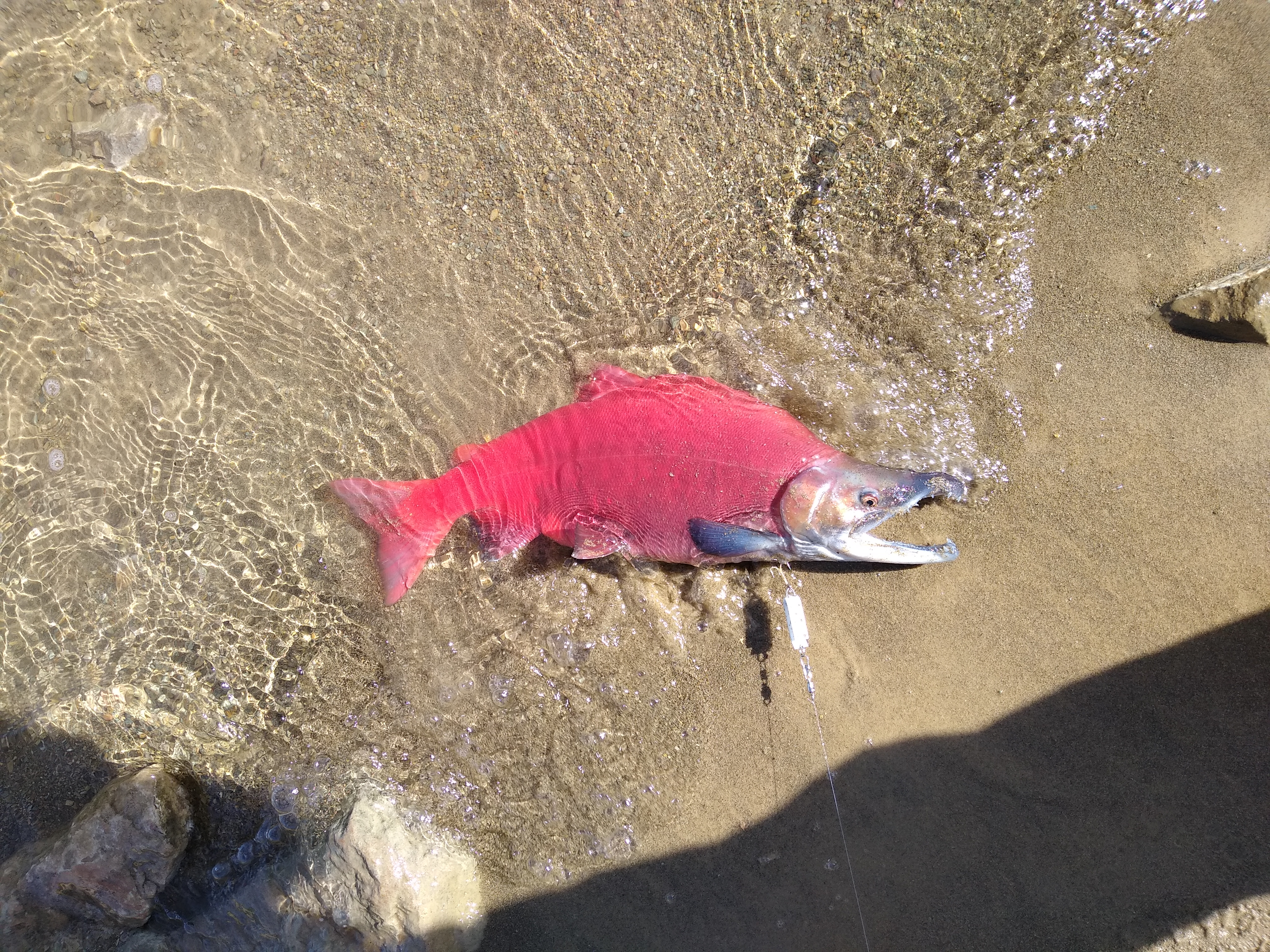
- Male Kokanee Salmon

Color coordinates
- Hex triplet: #FF91A4
- sRGB^{B} (r, g, b): (255, 145, 164)
- HSV (h, s, v): (350°, 43%, 100%)
- CIELCh_{uv} (L, C, h): (72, 73, 3°)
- Source: Crayola
- ISCC–NBS descriptor: Strong pink
- B: Normalized to [0–255] (byte)

This color which represents the pinkish tone of salmon is called salmon in Crayola crayons. This color was introduced by Crayola in 1949. See the List of Crayola crayon colors.

=== Scarlet ===
Scarlet
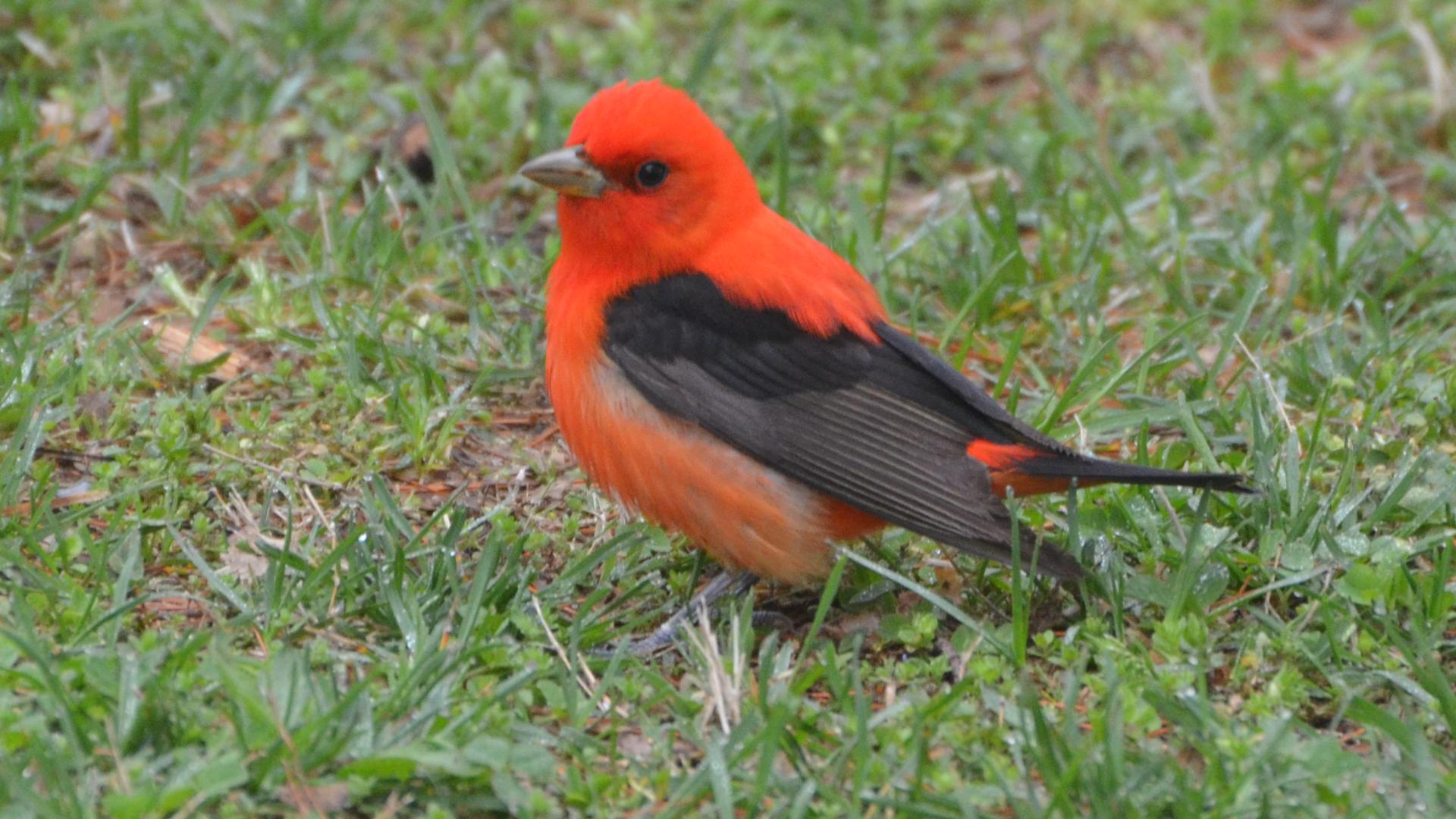
- A scarlet tanager

Color coordinates
- Hex triplet: #FF2400
- sRGB^{B} (r, g, b): (255, 36, 0)
- HSV (h, s, v): (8°, 100%, 100%)
- CIELCh_{uv} (L, C, h): (55, 172, 14°)
- ISCC–NBS descriptor: Vivid reddish orange
- B: Normalized to [0–255] (byte)

Scarlet is a bright red with a slightly orange tinge. According to surveys in Europe and the United States, scarlet and other bright shades of red are the colors most associated with courage, force, passion, heat, and joy. In the Roman Catholic Church, scarlet is the color worn by cardinals, and is associated with the blood of Christ and the Christian martyrs, and with sacrifice.

=== Spanish red ===
Spanish red

Color coordinates
- Hex triplet: #E60026
- sRGB^{B} (r, g, b): (230, 0, 38)
- HSV (h, s, v): (350°, 100%, 90%)
- CIELCh_{uv} (L, C, h): (48, 156, 10°)
- Source: Gallego and Sanz
- ISCC–NBS descriptor: Vivid reddish orange
- B: Normalized to [0–255] (byte)

Spanish red, an iron oxide red also known as torch red, is the color that is called rojo (the Spanish word for "red") in the Guía de coloraciones (Guide to colorations) by Rosa Gallego and Juan Carlos Sanz, a color dictionary published in 2005 that is widely popular in the Hispanophone realm.

=== Tea rose ===
Tea rose
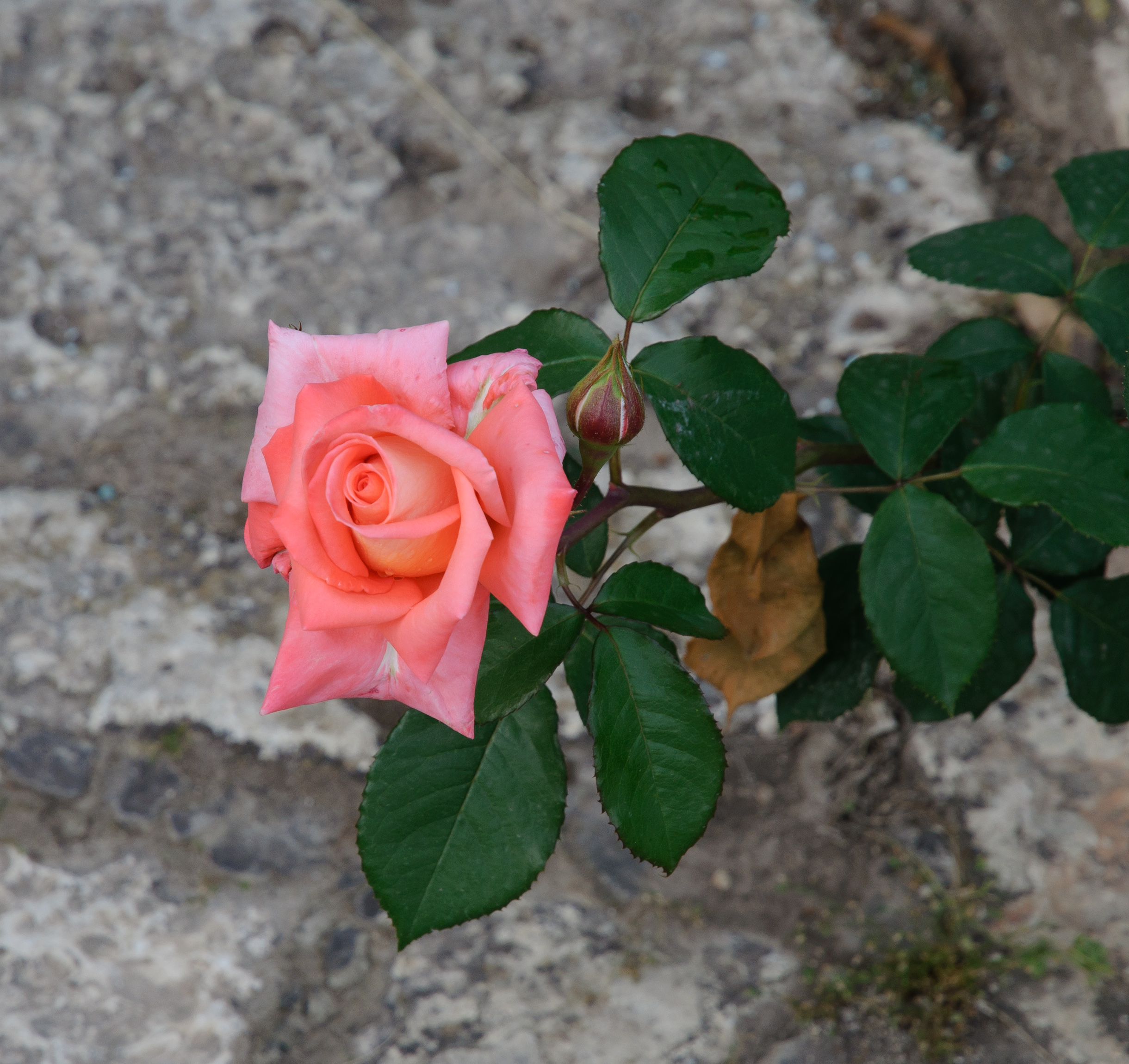
- Tea rose color

Color coordinates
- Hex triplet: #F4C2C2
- sRGB^{B} (r, g, b): (244, 194, 194)
- HSV (h, s, v): (0°, 20%, 96%)
- CIELCh_{uv} (L, C, h): (83, 32, 12°)
- Source: ISCC-NBS
- ISCC–NBS descriptor: Moderate yellowish pink
- B: Normalized to [0–255] (byte)

The color tea rose is the tint of the color that is used in interior design. This color is popular in interior design for painting bedrooms, especially among women.

There is a different color sometimes called tea rose, which is the color of an orange rose called a tea rose. This other color is technically Congo pink.

The first recorded use of tea rose as a color name in English was in 1884.

=== Tomato ===
Tomato
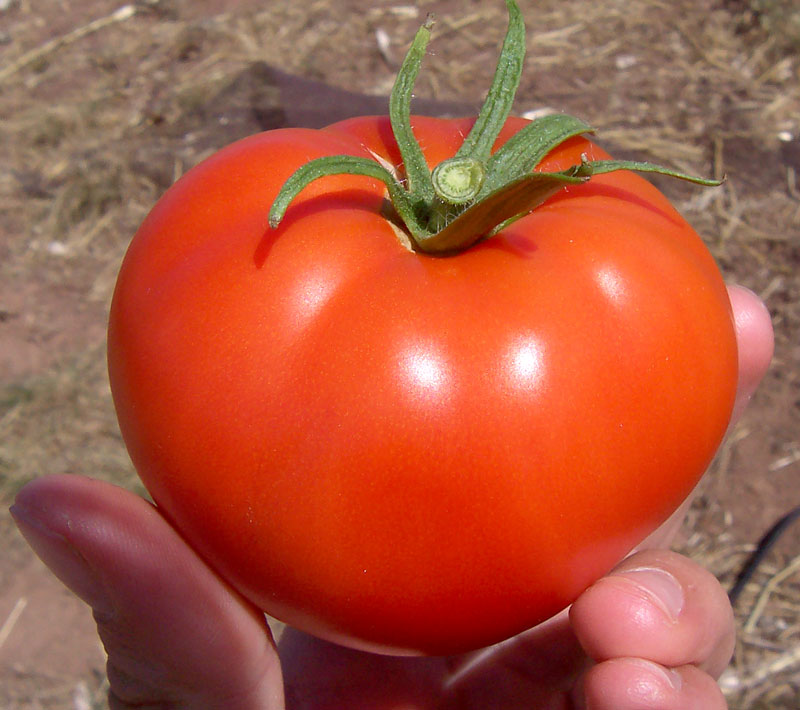
- A typical tomato

Color coordinates
- Hex triplet: #FF6347
- sRGB^{B} (r, g, b): (255, 99, 71)
- HSV (h, s, v): (9°, 72%, 100%)
- CIELCh_{uv} (L, C, h): (62, 129, 17°)
- Source: X11
- ISCC–NBS descriptor: Vivid reddish orange
- B: Normalized to [0–255] (byte)

The web color tomato is a medium reddish-orange color that approximates the color of common supermarket tomatoes. Many vine-ripened tomatoes are a bit redder. The color of tomato soup is slightly less saturated.

The first recorded use of tomato as a color name in English was in 1891.

When the X11 color names were invented in 1987, the color tomato was formulated as one of them.

=== Turkey red ===
Turkey red

Color coordinates
- Hex triplet: #A91101
- sRGB^{B} (r, g, b): (169, 17, 1)
- HSV (h, s, v): (6°, 99%, 66%)
- CIELCh_{uv} (L, C, h): (36, 114, 13°)
- ISCC–NBS descriptor: Strong reddish brown
- B: Normalized to [0–255] (byte)

Turkey red is a color that was widely used to dye cotton in the 18th and 19th centuries. It was made using the root of the Rubia plant, through a long and laborious process. It originated in India or Turkey, and was brought to Europe in the 1740s. In France, it was known as rouge d'Andrinople.

=== Venetian red ===
Venetian red

Color coordinates
- Hex triplet: #C80815
- sRGB^{B} (r, g, b): (200, 8, 21)
- HSV (h, s, v): (356°, 96%, 78%)
- CIELCh_{uv} (L, C, h): (42, 136, 12°)
- Source: ColorHexa
- ISCC–NBS descriptor: Vivid reddish orange
- B: Normalized to [0–255] (byte)

Venetian red is a light and warm (somewhat unsaturated) pigment that is a darker shade of red. The composition of Venetian red changed over time. Originally it consisted of natural ferric oxide (Fe_{2}O_{3}, partially hydrated) obtained from the red hematite. Modern versions are frequently made with synthetic red iron oxide produced via calcination of green vitriol mixed with white chalk. The pigment contains up to 50% of the ferric oxide.

Historically, Venetian red was a red earth color often used in Italian Renaissance paintings.

=== Vermilion ===
Vermilion
- Chinese carved cinnabar lacquerware

Color coordinates
- Hex triplet: #E34234
- sRGB^{B} (r, g, b): (227, 66, 52)
- HSV (h, s, v): (5°, 77%, 89%)
- CIELCh_{uv} (L, C, h): (52, 130, 14°)
- Source: Maerz and Paul
- ISCC–NBS descriptor: Vivid reddish orange
- B: Normalized to [0–255] (byte)

Vermilion (sometimes spelled vermillion) is both a brilliant red or scarlet pigment, originally made from the powdered mineral cinnabar. It was widely used in the art and decoration of Ancient Rome, in the illuminated manuscripts of the Middle Ages, in the paintings of the Renaissance, as sindoor, an Indian cosmetic powder, and in the art and lacquerware of China.

=== Orange Red ===
Orange Red

Color coordinates
- Hex triplet: #FF4500
- sRGB^{B} (r, g, b): (255, 69, 0)
- HSV (h, s, v): (16°, 100%, 100%)
- CIELCh_{uv} (L, C, h): (58, 158, 17°)
- B: Normalized to [0–255] (byte)

Orange Red is the hue between red and vermillion.

== See also ==
- Lists of colors
- Iron oxide red
- Ruby (color)

== Sources ==
- Gettens, R. J.; Stout, G. L. (1966). "Iron Oxide Red". Painting Materials: A Short Encyclopedia. Courier Corporation. p. 122. ISBN 978-0-486-14242-5. OCLC 868969354.
