= Bloodlust =

Bloodlust may refer to:

- Homicidal ideation
- Human hematophagy
- Bloodlust!, a 1961 American film
- Bloodlust, the home video title of the 1981 film Docteur Jekyll et les femmes
- Bloodlust (1992 film), a 1992 Australian film
- Bloodlust: Subspecies III, a 1994 Romanian-American film
- Bloodlust (Through the Eyes of the Dead album), 2005
- Bloodlust (Body Count album), 2017
- Vampire Hunter D: Bloodlust, a 2000 Japanese animated film
- "Bloodlust" (Supernatural), an episode of the television series Supernatural
- Bloodlust (roleplaying game), published 1991
- Bloodlust, the original name of the American thrash metal band Blood Feast (band)

== See also ==
- Blood (disambiguation)
- Lust (disambiguation)
