= Watermedia =

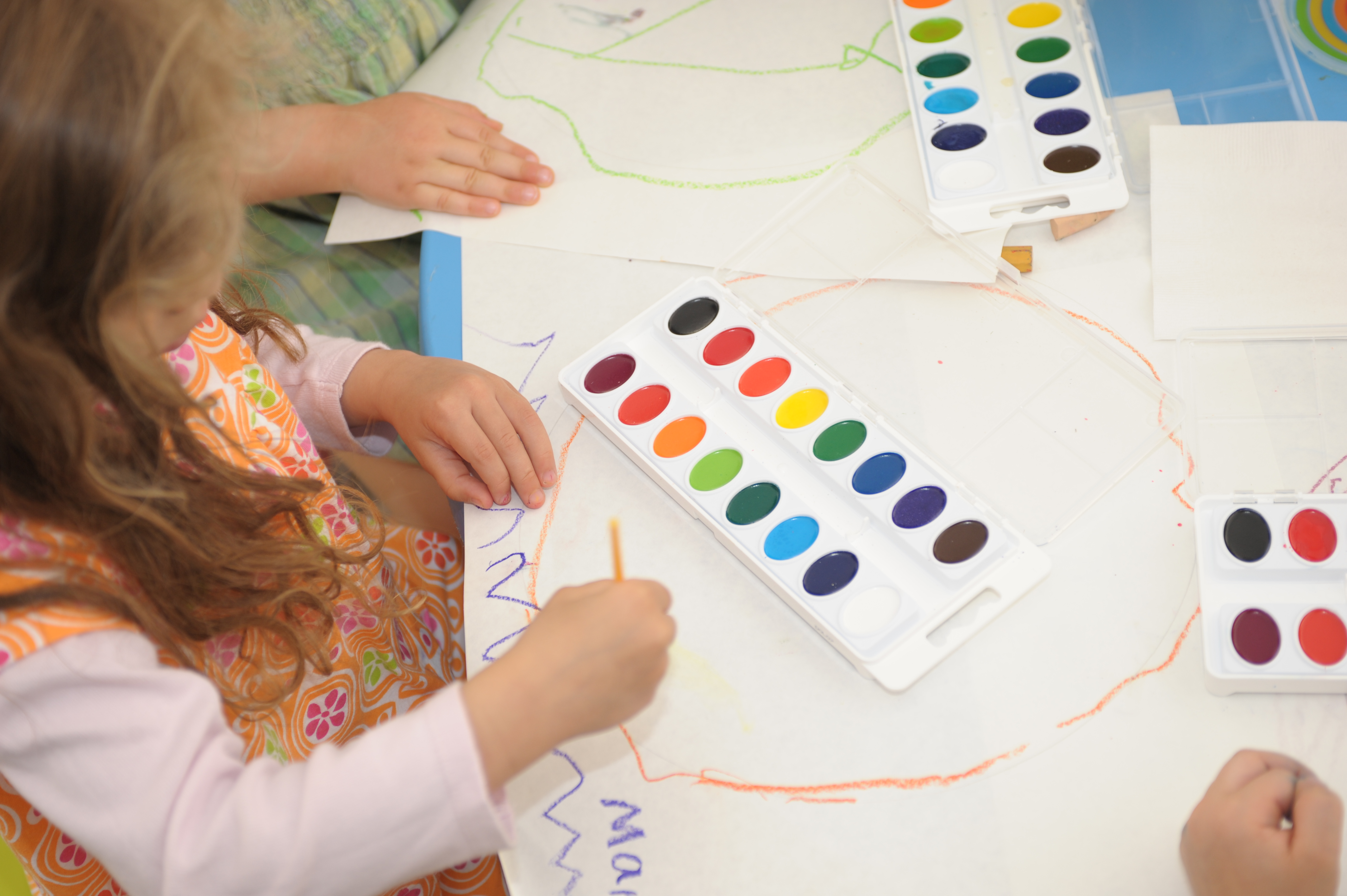
Children with simple water-based paint

In art, watermedia is the general term for media that are distinguished from oil or other media by being diluted with water when used. Watermedia include watercolors, gouache and acrylic, amongst others. It is sometimes combined with other media, commonly collage.

There are some unusual examples of water media being diluted with Coca-Cola, Diet Coke, tequila and sweat instead of water, and painter Johnny O'Brady has "added tea to [his] brush water".

There are several watermedia societies.

Watercolor

Watercolor painting allows artists to use many techniques, including wet-on-wet painting, in which the paint moves freely on wet paper. Another approach to watercolor painting is a wet-on-dry technique, which is when wet paint is applied to dry paper. Many artists use a few additional effects and methods for this painting medium: the dry-brush effect, edge darkening, intentional backgrounds, and flow patterns. Technology is even impacting modern watercolor with scientists attempting to create computers that are capable of making their watercolor paintings.

Watercolor painting has even been proven to help cancer patients. A study conducted by medical professionals from the Department of Medical Oncology of Akdeniz University and Medical Park Hospital in Turkey was created to determine if painting art therapy is effective in lowering levels of depression in cancer patients. Patients undergoing chemotherapy were split into a control and tested group. The tested group participated in the art therapy program and painted with watercolor paint during their treatment. Participants were given a questionnaire that evaluated their quality of life and depression levels before and after their treatments. Watercolor painting was found to boost the moods of patients significantly. Quality of life scores for patients who had painted increased while depression levels dropped dramatically compared to patients who did not participate in the art therapy program.
