= Lust for Blood (album) =

Studio album by Velvet Acid Christ
- Released: September 26, 2006
- Recorded: 2005–2006
- Genres: Electro-industrial EBM, darkwave, gothic rock
- Length: 69:37
- Label: Metropolis Records
- Producer: Bryan Erickson

Velvet Acid Christ chronology
Oblivion Interface	Lust for Blood	The Art of Breaking Apart

Lust for Blood is the eleventh original album by electro-industrial band Velvet Acid Christ. The album's promotional single is titled "Wound", which was on the Deutsche Alternative Chart for 8 weeks and reached number 10 on Billboard's Hot Dance Singles Sales in 2006.

Inspirations for the album included Lene Lovich, Orchestral Manoeuvres in the Dark, Radiohead, Rose McDowall, Siouxsie Sioux, the Chemical Brothers, and the Legendary Pink Dots.

== Track listing ==
1. Wound
2. Parasite
3. Discolored Eyes
4. Crushed
5. Disconnected Nightmare
6. Polyester Meth Zeus
7. Kashmir Crack Krishna
8. Ghost in the Circuit
9. Machine
10. Lust
11. For
12. Blood
13. Psychoaktive Landscapes
14. Ghost Regen
