= Lust (disambiguation) =

Lust is an intense craving or drive that is directly associated with the thinking or fantasizing about one's desire, usually in a sexual way.

Lust may also refer to:

- Lust in Christianity, one of the seven deadly sins
- Lust (Lords of Acid album), 1991
- Lust (Ambitious Lovers album), 1991
- Lust (Michael Rother album), 1983
- Lust (Jelinek novel), a 1989 novel by Austrian Nobel prize-winner Elfriede Jelinek
- Lust (Ryman novel), a novel by Canadian writer Geoff Ryman
- Lust (Fullmetal Alchemist), a character in the manga and anime series Fullmetal Alchemist
- "Lust", a song by Tori Amos on her album To Venus and Back
- "Lust", from the EP Lesser Man by Boy Harsher, 2014
- "Lust" (Kendrick Lamar song), 2017
- "Lust" (Lil Skies song), 2017
- Lust (color), a shade of red
- Lust (2010 film), an Egyptian film
- Lust (2018 film), an Indian film
- LUST, an acronym for Leaking Underground storage tank
- Lustboy (born 1994), nickname of Ham Jang-sik, Korean League of Legends player

== Surname ==
- David Lust, American politician
- Erika Lust, Swedish screenplay writer, director, producer and author
- Matthias Lust (born 1970), German football coach and a former player
- Ulli Lust (born 1967), Austrian cartoonist
- Victoria Lust (born 1989), English professional squash player
- Xavier Lust, Belgian furniture designer and sculptor
