= 1717 Main =

Office skyscraper in Dallas, Texas

Comerica Bank Tower

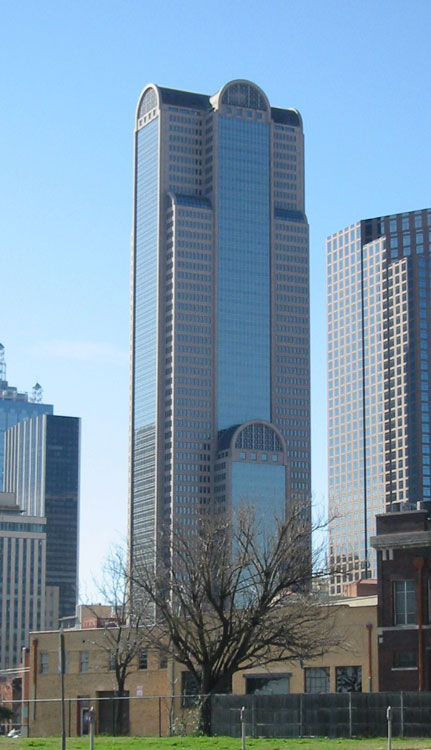
- Alternative names: Bank One Center; Chase Center; Momentum Place

General information
- Type: Commercial offices
- Location: 1717 Main Street; Dallas, Texas
- Coordinates: 32.78157°N 96.7966°W
- Construction started: February 1985
- Completed: 1987
- Owner: 1717 Dallas Partners LLC

Height
- Roof: 239.88 m (787.0 ft)

Technical details
- Floor count: 60
- Floor area: 142,200 m^{2} (1,531,000 sq ft)
- Lifts/elevators: 32

Design and construction
- Architect: Johnson/Burgee Architects
- Main contractor: HCB Contractors

Website
- comericabanktower.com

1717 Main (formerly Momentum Place, Bank One Center, Chase Center, and Comerica Bank Tower) is a 60-story postmodern skyscraper in the Main Street District in downtown Dallas, Texas. Standing at a structural height of 787 feet (240 m), it is the third tallest skyscraper in the city of Dallas. (If the antennas and spires of Renaissance Tower were excluded, Comerica Bank Tower would be the second tallest.) It is also the sixth tallest building in Texas and the 61st tallest building in the United States. The building was designed by Philip Johnson and John Burgee, and was completed in 1987. The structure has 1,500,000 square feet (100,000 m^{2}) of office space.

== History ==
Originally known as Momentum Place, the tower was built as the new headquarters of MCorp Bank. The site, which included the Woolf Brothers and Volk Brothers department stores, was one of the busiest blocks in downtown Dallas. Adjacent blocks included the Neiman Marcus Building, Wilson Building, Titche-Goettinger Building and Mercantile National Bank Building. The entire block from Ervay to St. Paul was leveled to make way for the new tower. The original design as proposed by Johnson called for several office buildings, a hotel and a large shopping mall designed in an ornate classical style. MCorp Bank instead desired a more restrained office tower without any retail; the design for the banking hall was also scaled down.

Construction began in 1985 and the tower opened in 1987, with MCorp initially leasing 600,000 square feet (56,000 m^{2}) of space after moving from the Mercantile National Bank Building. At time of completion it was the most legally-contested building on the Dallas skyline due to the economic downturn of the late 1980s and the savings and loan scandal. MCorp Bank collapsed shortly after the building's opening and the bank was dissolved by Bank One. Developers and financial backers sued over ownership of the tower. Other parties defaulted on loans, and the building went into foreclosure in 1991 and again in 1995, the two largest in city history. Without a lead tenant, the tower was remarketed into fully leasable class AA office space. Due to the economic downturn, this was the last high-rise to be completed in downtown in the 1980s.

In 1997 Crescent Real Estate Equities, in partnership with the financer Trizec Properties, bought the Bank One Center from Cigna and the Teacher Retirement System of Texas for $238 million.

On December 14, 2006, Crescent sold the structure for US$216 million to Los Angeles–based Metropolitan Real Estate Developers.

On March 6, 2007, Comerica announced its decision to relocate its corporate headquarters to Dallas. In August the company announced that it selected 1717 Main Street in Downtown Dallas and that the tower would be renamed Comerica Bank Tower. The company executives began moving into 1717 Main Street in November 2007.

The firm TM Advertising planned to move into the building on January 2, 2008. It was scheduled to take four floors, with a total of 130,000 square feet (12,000 m^{2}) of space. 340 employees were scheduled to move there. The space TM moved into was previously occupied by TXU Energy.

In 2024, it was acquired by Slate Asset Management. In 2026, it was valued at $114.5 million, and was 70 percent leased.

== Design ==
- The tower uses a traditional three-sectioned skyscraper form with upper level setbacks. A modern interpretation of the classic barrel vault is used throughout the structure, giving the building an overall art deco style. The setbacks carve a cross shape from the building's top section, but sheets of glass descending like a waterfall from the vaults continue the illusion to street level.
- The first five floors contain a massive banking/stock exchange hall with a vaulted ceiling and skylight.
- The building contains a 3 level underground parking garage and is connected to the Elm Street Garage, giving tenants 1,530 parking spaces.
- Comerica Tower is a main hub in the Dallas Pedestrian Network and features several retail spaces below ground.
- The east side of the building features a small plaza with a grid of trees and benches facing the Titche-Goettinger Building.
- The building has been criticized heavily for its poor urban environment at street level. The lack of retail, block-long walls of polished granite and dark glass cause the tower to seem very formidable. The west side entrance plaza, located at one of the busiest corners in downtown Dallas, isolates the building from the street instead of acting like a true public space. At the time of opening, MCorp stated that the stolid exterior was intended. "We wanted a banking building, not an office building,' says MCorp chairman Gene Bishop. "We didn't want the block to be crowded. And we prevailed.' In 2009 a small restaurant extension was constructed along Main Street in the east plaza, hoping to mitigate some of these problems.

== See also ==
- List of tallest buildings in Dallas
- List of tallest buildings in Texas
- List of tallest buildings in the United States
