= Mercantile Building =

Mercantile Building may refer to:

- 10 East 40th Street, 48-story, 193 m (632 ft) skyscraper, also referred to as the Mercantile Building, in Manhattan, New York
- Mercantile National Bank Building, 31-story, 159.4 m (523 ft) skyscraper at 1700 Main Street, Dallas, Texas
- Mercantile Continental Building, building located at 1810 Commerce Street, Dallas, Texas
- Sun Mercantile Building, warehouse building in Phoenix, Arizona
- Mercantile Building Society, defunct UK building society
