= Titche-Goettinger =

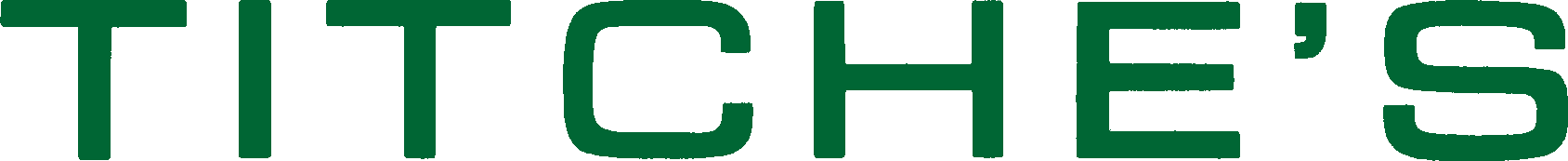
- Industry: Retail
- Founded: 1902
- Defunct: 1979
- Fate: merged with Joske's
- Successor: Joske's (1979–1987); Dillard's (1987–present)
- Headquarters: Dallas, Texas, United States
- Products: Clothing, footwear, furniture, jewelry, beauty products, and housewares

Titche-Goettinger (later known as Titche's) was a department store chain based in Dallas, Texas (United States). It was established in 1902 and was a major player in the Dallas retail market until its merger with Joske's, which was later absorbed by Dillard's.

== History ==
The Titche-Goettinger Department Store, formed in 1902 by Max Goettinger and Edward Titche, opened on the southeast corner of Elm and Murphy streets. Two years later, they moved to the Wilson Building. In 1928, the company began construction on a new location between Main and Elm streets at St. Paul Street to house more merchandise, including ready-to-wear apparel.

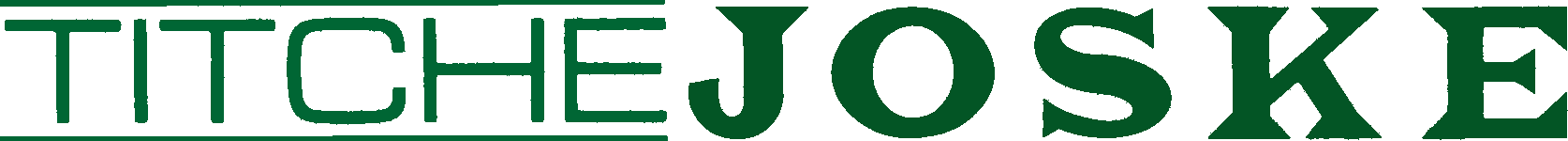
Titche-Joske transition logo

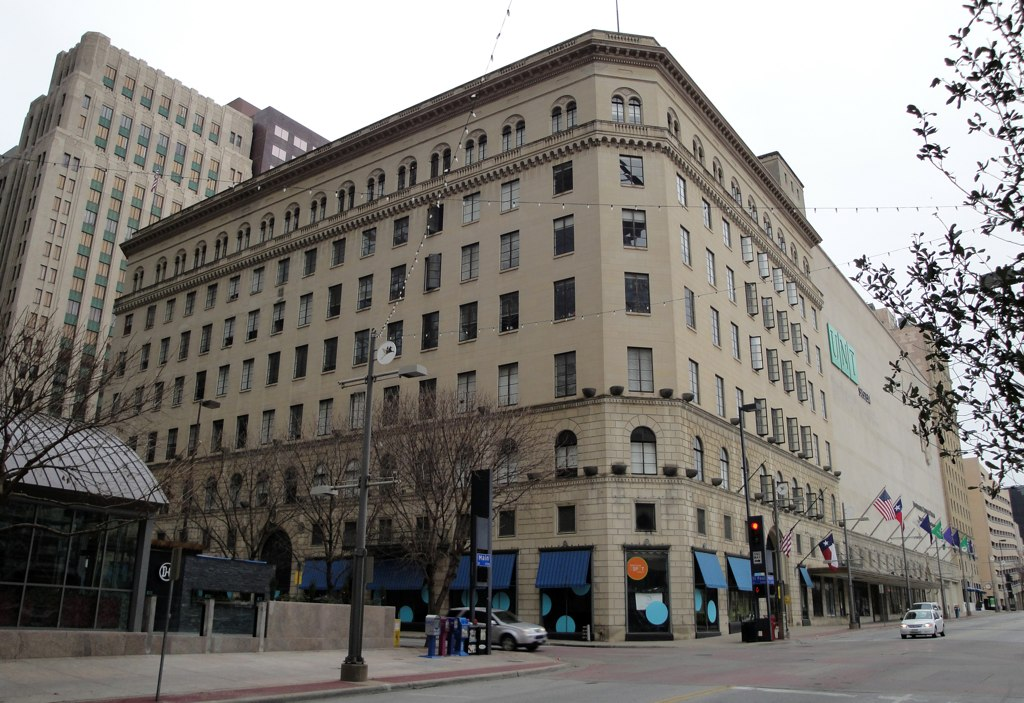
The Titche-Goettinger Building between Elm and Main at St. Paul in downtown Dallas was the department store's flagship between 1929 and 1979.

In December 1928, before the new building was complete, Titche-Goettinger was sold to Hahn Department Stores. Hahn would also purchase the San Antonio, Texas, retailer Joske's the following year. The Great Depression affected the retail market during Hahn's ownership, changing the market. The store's competitive edge was largely lost to hometown rivals Neiman Marcus and Sanger-Harris. In 1935, Hahn Department Stores changed its name to Allied Stores Corporation.

The department store expanded to the suburbs in the 1950s. Allied merged the Titche-Goettinger stores with Joske's in 1979, which was eventually purchased by Dillard's in 1987.

== Flagship store ==
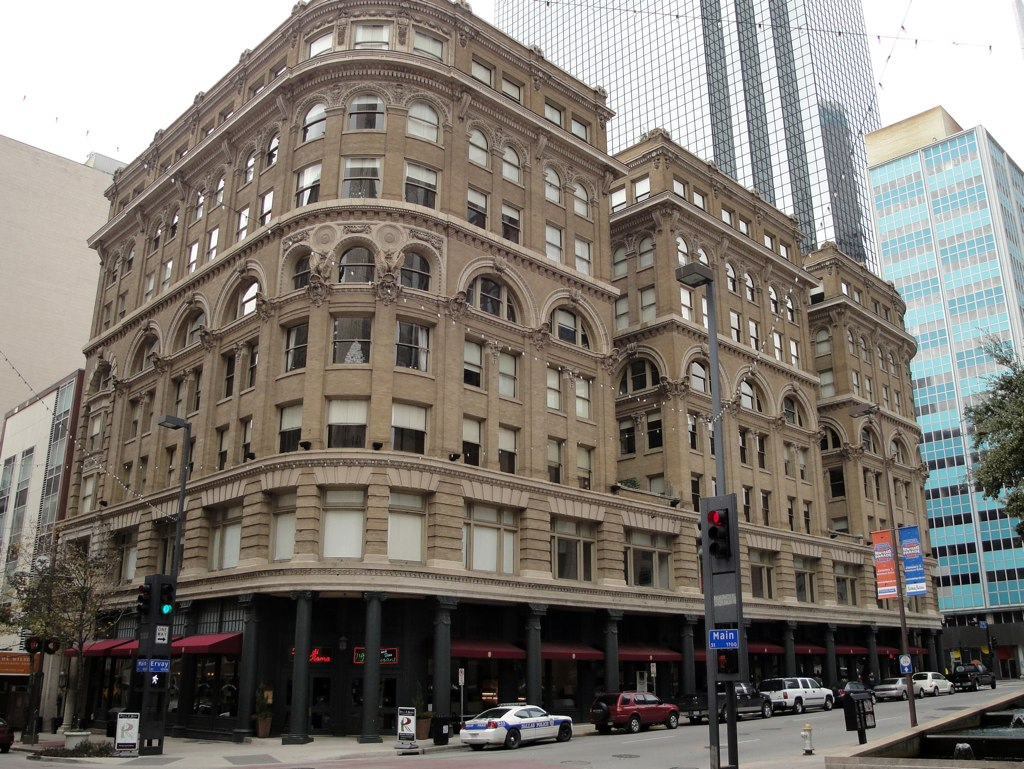
The Wilson Building at Main and Ervay Streets in downtown Dallas housed Titche-Goettinger between 1904 and 1929. Today it is a luxury-apartment building.

The downtown Dallas flagship store is listed in the National Register of Historic Places and is a key contributing structure in Dallas' Harwood Historic District and Main Street District. It opened in 1929 and closed in 1987, and now houses loft-style apartments and the Universities Center at Dallas.
