= Mercantile National Bank Building =

Skyscraper in Dallas, Texas

- Interactive map of the Mercantile National Bank Building area
- Alternative names: The Merc; Mercantile Building

General information
- Status: Completed
- Type: Residential
- Architectural style: Moderne Art Deco
- Location: 1800 Main Street; Dallas, Texas
- Coordinates: 32°46′51″N 96°47′49″W
- Completed: 1943
- Owner: Brookfield Asset Management
- Operator: Brookfield Asset Management

Height
- Antenna spire: 159.4 m (523 ft)
- Roof: 131.1 m (430 ft)

Technical details
- Floor count: 31

Design and construction
- Architects: Walter W. Ahlschlager; Donald Nelson
- Mercantile National Bank Building
- U.S. Historic district – Contributing property
- Dallas Landmark
- Part of: Dallas Downtown Historic District (ID04000894)
- DLMK No.: H/129

Significant dates
- Designated CP: August 11, 2006
- Designated DLMK: December 13, 2006

The Mercantile National Bank Building (known colloquially as The Merc) is a 31-story, 159.4 m (523 ft) skyscraper at 1800 Main Street in the Main Street district of downtown Dallas, Texas. It is the former home of the Mercantile National Bank, which later became MCorp Bank. The design of the skyscraper features Moderne styling from the Art Deco era and was designed by Walter W. Ahlschlager. The building has a series of setbacks that is crowned by an ornamental four-sided clock along with a decorative weather spire. The Merc was the main element of a four-building complex that eventually spanned a full city block.

== History ==
The site along Ervay Street between Main and Commerce previously housed the landmark Post Office building constructed in 1889 which featured a prominent clock tower and gingerbread architecture. After abandonment, it was the subject of rumors, plans and schemes, but by 1936, it had been declared a liability by local business leaders and was razed.

The Mercantile National Bank Building was completed in 1943 and was the only major skyscraper constructed during World War II. The U.S. government had called for a halt of private construction to fuel supply materials for the war effort. However, most of the tower's steel had been prefabricated and was given a special waiver from the government. The bank lobby Art Deco wood murals were the largest in the world at the time. In addition to the bank and other offices, the federal government took 10 floors to hold offices for various war agencies. Mercantile Bank owner and founder Robert L. Thornton constructed his own penthouse level in the upper floors.

In 1947, an illuminated tower was constructed, which newspaper-owned KERA (later renamed WFAA-FM) used for radio broadcasts. In 1958, this tower was replaced by the current illumination tower and clock. In the 1960s, the original stone façade at the base of the building was covered by a modernist curtain wall facade.

At its completion, the Merc was the tallest building west of the Mississippi River and it was the tallest building in Dallas until 1954, when Republic Bank Tower I surpassed it. The building has 31 stories, and when the 115-foot (35 m) ornamental clock tower is included, is 545 feet (166 m) feet tall; making it the 19th-tallest building in Dallas. It also contains 359,348 square feet (33,385 m^{2}) of floor space.

=== Expansion ===
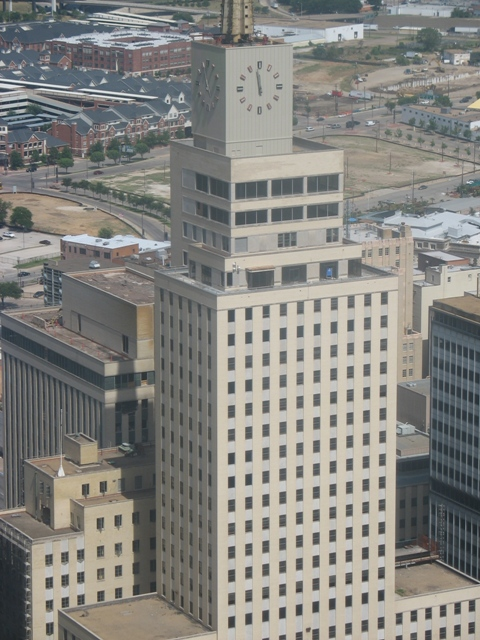
The Main Tower of the Mercantile Complex pre-renovation, with the Securities Building in the middle and the Dallas Building behind.

The Merc was the main element of a four building complex that eventually spanned a full city block. The Mercantile Securities Building was constructed immediately east of the main tower in 1949 and was 14 stories tall, including 213,270 square feet (19,813 m^{2}) of space. The Mercantile Dallas Building was completed in 1954. It was 360 feet (110 m) and 22 stories tall with 347,037 square feet (32,241 m^{2}) inside. It was built behind the southern half of the Securities building and ran along Commerce Street to St Paul Street. The final addition to the block was the Securities Annex in 1972. It initially was five stories and designed for vertical expansion at a later date. Its 116,322 square feet (10,807 m^{2}) of space was in the northeast corner of the block.

The bank also built and purchased other structures near the main tower. The Mercantile Continental Building was built in 1948 across Commerce Street to serve the growing bank's parking and office space needs. The bank later built the Jackson Street Garage, which contained the bank's large motor bank, behind the Continental Building. A tunnel was built to connect the garage and Continental Building to the main complex via the Dallas Building.

In 1976, the bank bought the neighboring Vaughn Tower across Commerce Street. Prather Street divides the Continental and Vaughn Tower. The bank renamed the building the Mercantile Commerce Building.

The final building to be built by MCorp Bank was Momentum Place, completed in 1987 across Main Street. MCorp occupied 600,000 square feet (60,000 m^{2}) of the 1,500,000 square feet (100,000 m^{2}) building. The building connected the original complex to the Dallas Pedestrian Network to the north with a new underground walkway to the Securities Annex.

The economic downturn of the late 1980s along with the savings and loan crisis would signal the end of MCorp Bank. It was dissolved by Bank One in the summer of 1989 after numerous quarters of earnings losses. The complex was still used occasionally until the building became vacant on February 5, 1993.

=== Adaptive reuse ===
Construction and demolition of the additions showing tunnel portals under Main to Comerica Bank Tower.

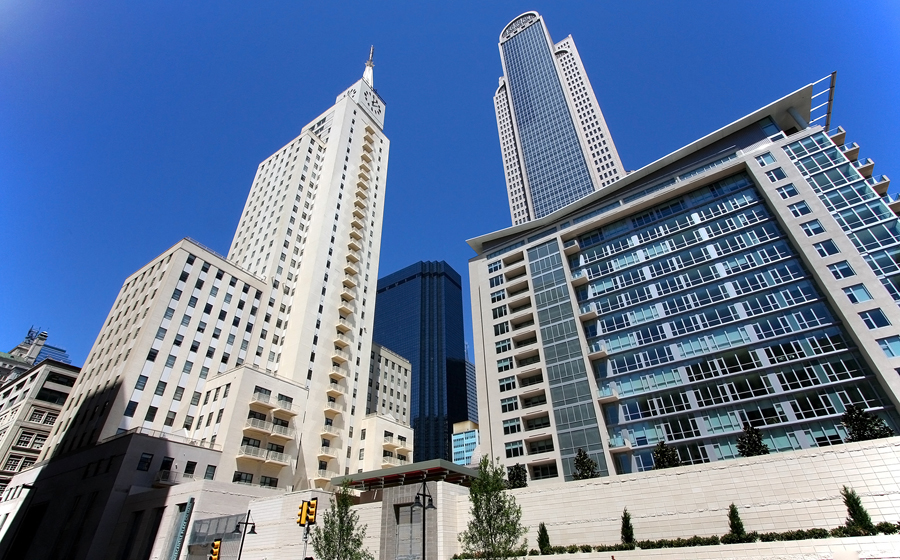
The renovated Mercantile Place on Main, which includes the historic Mercantile building and new Element, both luxury apartments.

In 1985, Cadillac Fairview, developer of Toronto's Eaton Centre, proposed renovating the complex into a 140,000-square-foot (13,000 m^{2}) retail center, connecting adjacent anchors Neiman Marcus and Joske's. The plan included demolition of the various additions and preservation of the main tower, but the project was later abandoned.

With the increased demand in urban living downtown, there was interest in converting the structure to residential uses. However, the complex was awash with asbestos, which would need to be removed before any remodeling could begin. The complex was also poorly configured for residential, as it had a lot of floor space without windows, requiring demolition of some buildings. The two combinations made for an expensive reconversion.

Three different proposals fell through before Cleveland-based Forest City Enterprises was able to make the financial numbers work. FCE announced a deal with the City of Dallas in June 2005 to receive US$60.5 million from the city to redo the building. The main tower was converted to 225 apartments with ground floor retail. The three additions, not considered historically significant, were demolished. The modernist curtain wall on the base was removed, revealing its original exterior and balconies were added to the east façade, although most of the interior design elements were lost during years of renovation.

On the site of the Securities Annex is a new 15-story apartment building, the Element, with parking constructed beneath. A pool and plaza were added for the residents of Mercantile Place, which also includes the historic Wilson Building in an adjacent block. The grand opening was held in April 2009.

Retail tenants have been slow to materialize due to economic conditions at the time of opening. Jean Michel's, an upscale French restaurant, was scheduled to open in the base of the Element building, overlooking Main Street Garden Park, which lies across St. Paul Street. These plans, however, fell through.

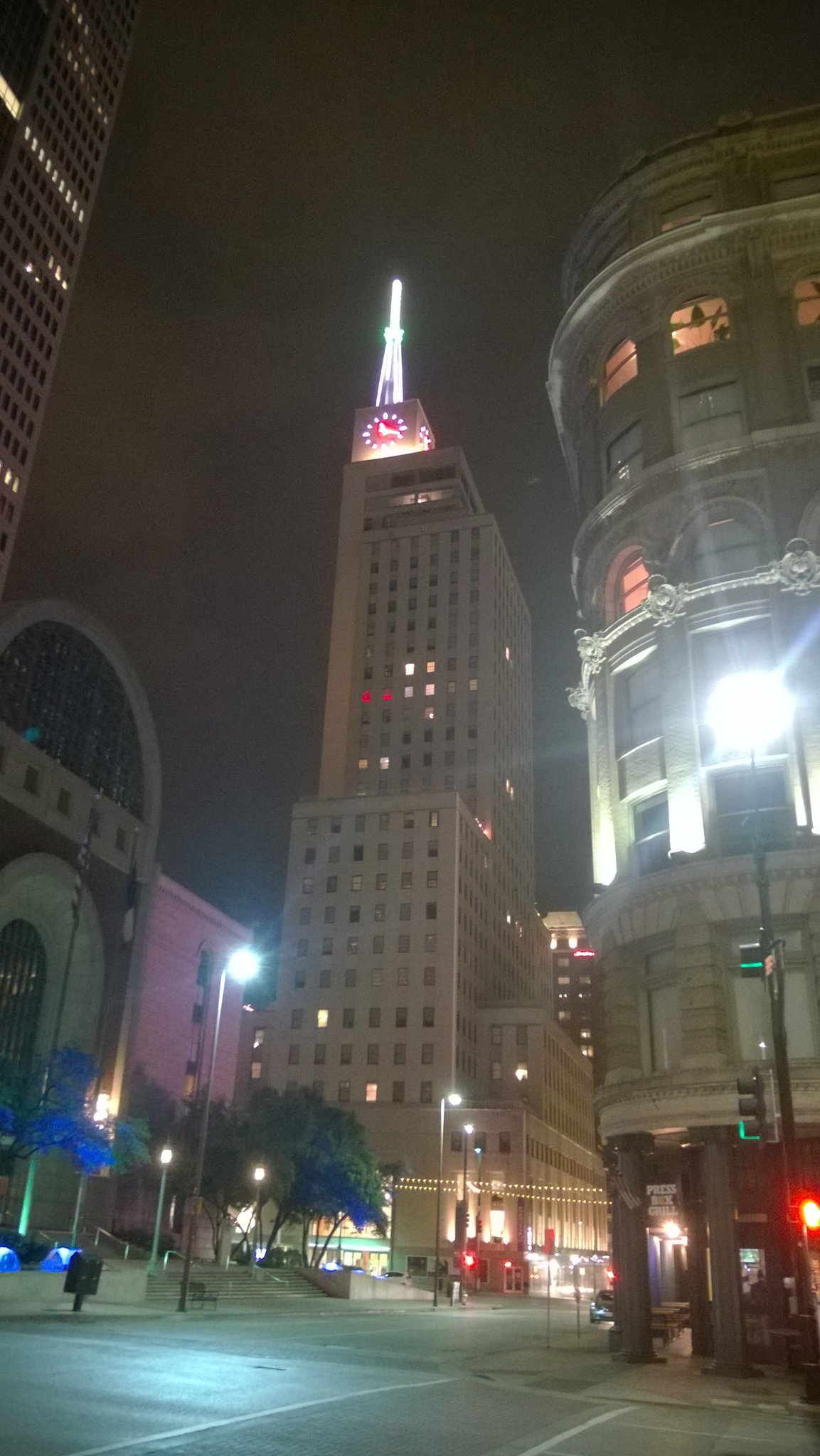
The Mercantile at night.

The owner will receive US$5 million from the city to convert the neighboring Continental Building into 150 additional residential units. Also, the owner will convert another complex of historic buildings that Atmos Energy donated to the city for residential use. This project has since been transferred to Hamilton Properties.

== Tower clock ==
The clock tower and 115-foot (35 m)-tall ornamental spire is a local landmark and reference point in downtown Dallas. There are four 20 ft (9.4meter) diameter tower clocks, which are among the largest clock faces in the United States. New tower clock movements and hands were manufactured in 2007 by Electric Time Company. The clock hands are lighted with LEDs, which replaced the original neon. Above the clock, a series of LED (originally neon) lights display weather information. White light rings flash upward when temperatures will rise and downward when they fall. A star-shaped light at the spire's top glows green when weather forecast is fair and red when it's inclement.

== Artwork ==
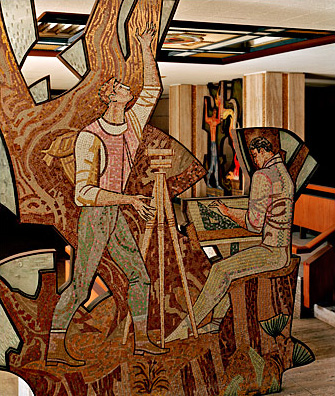
Mosaics created by artist Millard Sheets.

During the 1950s building expansions, substantial mosaics by artist Millard Sheets were fabricated in Venice and installed throughout the lobbies, stairways and executive offices. During the demolition and renovation process, historical preservationists called for the removal of dozens of mosaics, stained glass pieces, and enamel artwork. Dallas investor and developer Timothy Headington stepped up with the estimated $270,000 needed to preserve and store the artwork. A local company, Studio van Enter, cut the mosaics free of the travertine and removed the artwork in 2006. Smaller decorative elements have been redisplayed in public areas of the renovated building while the larger pieces remain in storage. A similar mosaic exists on the exterior of the neighboring Mercantile Continental Building.

== Zoned schools ==
The Mercantile National Bank Building is within the Dallas Independent School District.

Residents are zoned to City Park Elementary School, Dade Middle School, and Madison High School.

== Tenants ==
- The Dallas Texans (now the Kansas City Chiefs) franchise was headquartered in the building from its founding in 1960 until it moved to Kansas City at the end of the 1962 season.

== See also ==
- List of buildings and structures in Dallas, Texas
- National Register of Historic Places listings in Dallas County, Texas
- List of Dallas Landmarks
- List of Largest Clock Faces
- Wilson Building (Dallas)
