= Mercantile Continental Building =

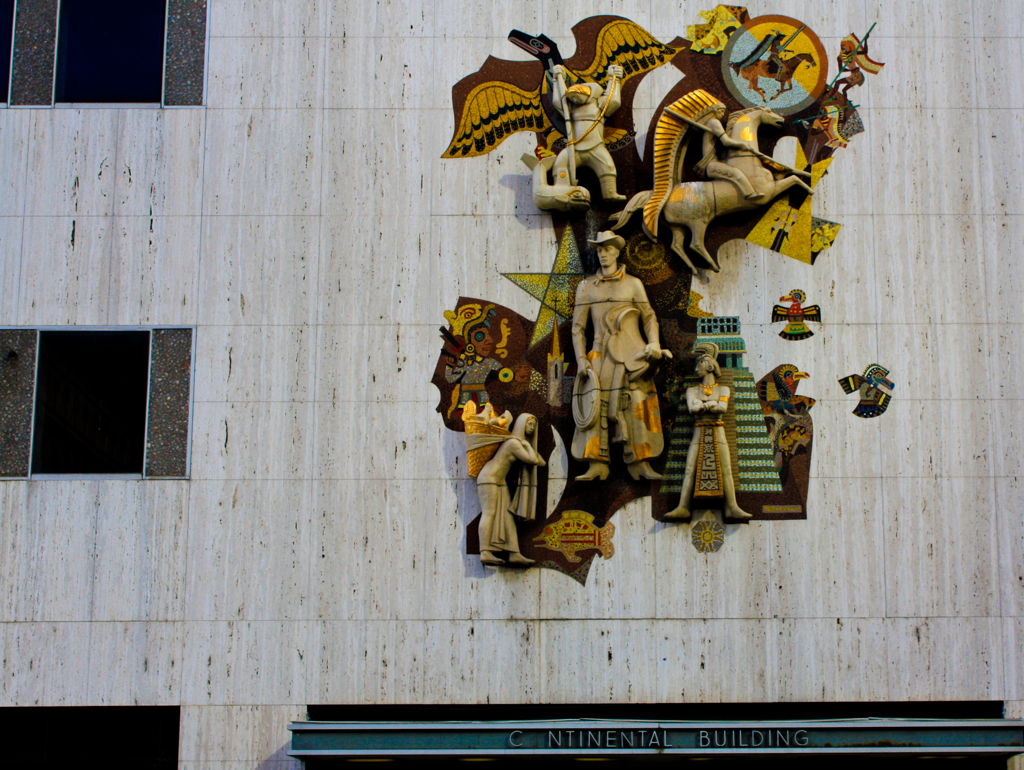
- Continental Building entrance with mosaic by Millard Sheets.
- Interactive map of the Mercantile Continental Building area

General information
- Status: Occupied
- Type: Residential
- Location: 1810 Commerce Street, Dallas, Texas, United States
- Coordinates: 32°46′49″N 96°47′45″W
- Opening: 1948, 1958
- Cost: $1.65 million
- Owner: Forest City Enterprises

Technical details
- Floor count: 11

Design and construction
- Architects: Walter W. Ahlschlager, Broad & Nelson
- Continental Building
- U.S. Historic district – Contributing property
- Part of: Dallas Downtown Historic District (ID04000894)
- Designated CP: August 11, 2006

The Mercantile Continental Building is located at 1810 Commerce Street in downtown Dallas, Texas (USA). It is a contributing structure at the edge of the Government District and adjacent to Main Street Garden Park. The building was built and owned by Mercantile National Bank and connected to their complex by an underground walkway.

== History ==
Originally named the Mercantile Commerce Building and designed in contemporary style using stone and tile, the building and garage opened in late 1948 at a cost of $1.65 million.

The building was constructed for Mercantile National Bank as an underground garage adjacent to their main offices at the Mercantile National Bank Building. Designed by Walter W. Ahlschlager, the structure contained 4 levels of underground parking and 3 levels of air conditioned office and retail space. Constructed as the first real underground parking structure in Dallas, the garage was accessed from Jackson, Prather and Harwood Streets and was capable of holding 1,250 cars in a continuous spiral.

In 1958 Mercantile National Bank renovated and expanded the building. Broad & Nelson designed an 8-floor, 201,297 sq ft (18,701.1 m^{2}) addition on top of the existing structure, and the building was connected by an underground pedestrian tunnel to the growing Mercantile complex. The pedestrian tunnels were later incorporated into the Dallas Pedestrian Network.

The building was renamed to "Mercantile Continental Building," and an adjacent building (formerly Vaughn Tower) was purchased by the bank and took the name "Mercantile Commerce Building."

Over the years the building housed expanding offices for Mercantile National Bank and other tenants. The FBI occupied the second floor from April 1964 to June 1980.

The Continental Building's office space became vacant when Mercantile National Bank moved to new headquarters at Momentum Place in 1987, but the garage continued to be used. During rehabilitation of the Mercantile Building in 2007 the underground connection was severed and the Continental Building's garage closed.

== Redevelopment ==
In June 2005 Forest City Enterprises entered into a deal with the City of Dallas to redevelop the Mercantile National Bank Building. That building was converted to luxury apartments and opened in 2009. As part of the deal, Forest City received $5 million from the city to convert the Continental Building into 150 residential units, but the building remained vacant after the economic downturn in 2008. In October 2009 the city approved $17.5 million in tax increment financing in a new contract with Forest City. With the new deal, Forest City developed 180 units and 5,000 square feet (460 m^{2}) of retail which it opened in early 2013. Because the deal included federal housing loans, 20 percent of the units were set aside for low-income residents.

== Artwork ==
During the building's expansion in 1959 R.L. Thornton, one-time president of Mercantile National Bank (and later Mayor of Dallas) commissioned a 30-foot (9.1 m)-high mosaic sculpture for the building by acclaimed California artist Millard Sheets.

The sculpture includes a cowboy, Native Americans, horses and wild animals made of carved stone and brightly colored Italian glass mosaic tiles and 22-karat gold ornamentation. Sheets also designed several mosaics for the Mercantile National Bank Building.

Local concern arose that the iconic artwork may be destroyed with redevelopment of the building, but Forest City stated in 2009 that they intend to preserve the mural.

== See also ==
- National Register of Historic Places listings in Dallas County, Texas
