= Hollywood Home Savings and Loan =

Historic bank building in Los Angeles, California

- Location within the Los Angeles metropolitan area

General information
- Architectural style: New Formalist
- Location: 1500–1518 North Vine Street, Hollywood, California
- Coordinates: 34.0985°N 118.3262°W
- Named for: Home Savings and Loan
- Year built: 1967

Design and construction
- Architect: Millard Sheets

Los Angeles Historic-Cultural Monument
- Designated: September 21, 2022
- Reference no.: 1268

Hollywood Home Savings and Loan, also known as Chase Bank Hollywood, is a historic bank building located at 1500–1518 North Vine Street, on the northeast corner of Vine and Sunset Boulevard, in Hollywood, California. It was designated a Los Angeles Historic-Cultural Monument in 2022.

== History ==
Hollywood Home Savings and Loan was designed by Millard Sheets for Howard Ahmanson and built in 1967. Upon completion, the building housed the Hollywood branch of Home Savings and Loan. Ownership changed to Washington Mutual following its acquisition of Home Savings and Loan in 1998, then to Chase Bank following its acquisition of Washington Mutual in 2008.

The building was designated Los Angeles Historic-Cultural Monument No. 1268 on September 21, 2022.

=== Location ===
Hollywood Home Savings and Loan was built on the former site of NBC Radio City. Before that, the site served as a film location for The Squaw Man, the first feature film filmed in Hollywood.

== Architecture and design ==
Hollywood Home Savings and Loan is a two-story commercial building that features a New Formalist design. It is rectangular in plan with a central volume flanked by shorter secondary volumes. The building has a steel frame, is clad in white travertine, features a flat roof with a bronze geometric-styled band at the roofline, and is positioned at a southwestern angle, facing the corner of Sunset Boulevard and Vine Street.

The building's primary entrance is accessed by wide concrete steps, while a secondary rear entrance is accessed by a ramp. Both entrances feature of two metal double doors with glazed panels, with the primary entrance also featuring a projecting frame. The building's side elevations feature vertical bands formed by floor-to-ceiling tripartite windows with bronze frames; the rear elevation features floor-to-ceiling windows framed in bronze as well.

The building is best known for its exterior decorations. Most notably, above the primary entrance the building features a mosaic mural of some of Hollywood's most famous movie stars in their most famous roles, the mural also including black granite panels inscribed with additional names behind the main stars. Additionally, the primary entrance is fronted by triangular plaza with planters and a fountain surrounding a 1920s Paul Manship sculpture titled The Flight of Europa, the sculpture depicting Europa riding Zeus in bull form while Cupid whispers in Europa's ear, with dolphins also included to symbolize the characters' destination. The rear of the building features stained-glass windows by Susan Hertel that depict numerous chase scenes, including those from Moby Dick and the Keystone Kops.

The building's interior contains a double-height lobby with skylights, murals, and glass panels that separate the lobby from the rear entrance.

The building has undergone numerous alterations over the years. Most notably, interior partitions and the ceiling were replaced in 1977, a vault and new room were added in 1985, the interior was remodeled in 2005, and wall, entry door, interior partition, and other interior adjustments were made in 2009. Additionally, the building's original signage was replaced by Chase Bank signage in 2022.
