= California style =

California style or California look may refer to any one of a wide range of subjects related to the culture of California:

- The "California Look" created by California designer Michael Taylor
- Cal looker, or California looker, a Volkswagen Bug modification originating in California
- California cuisine, a style of cooking originating in California
- California-style pizza, pizza using elements of California cuisine
- Ranch-style house, an architectural style originating in California
- California bungalow, an architectural style originating in California
- California Plein-Air Painting, a plein-air painting style originating in California
- California Scene, a style of early 20th century watercolor painting associated with the Chouinard Art Institute and Hollywood animation studios such as Walt Disney
- The California style of Western horse riding, which uses the Romal
