= Wilson Building (Dallas) =

- U.S. National Register of Historic Places
- U.S. Historic district – Contributing property
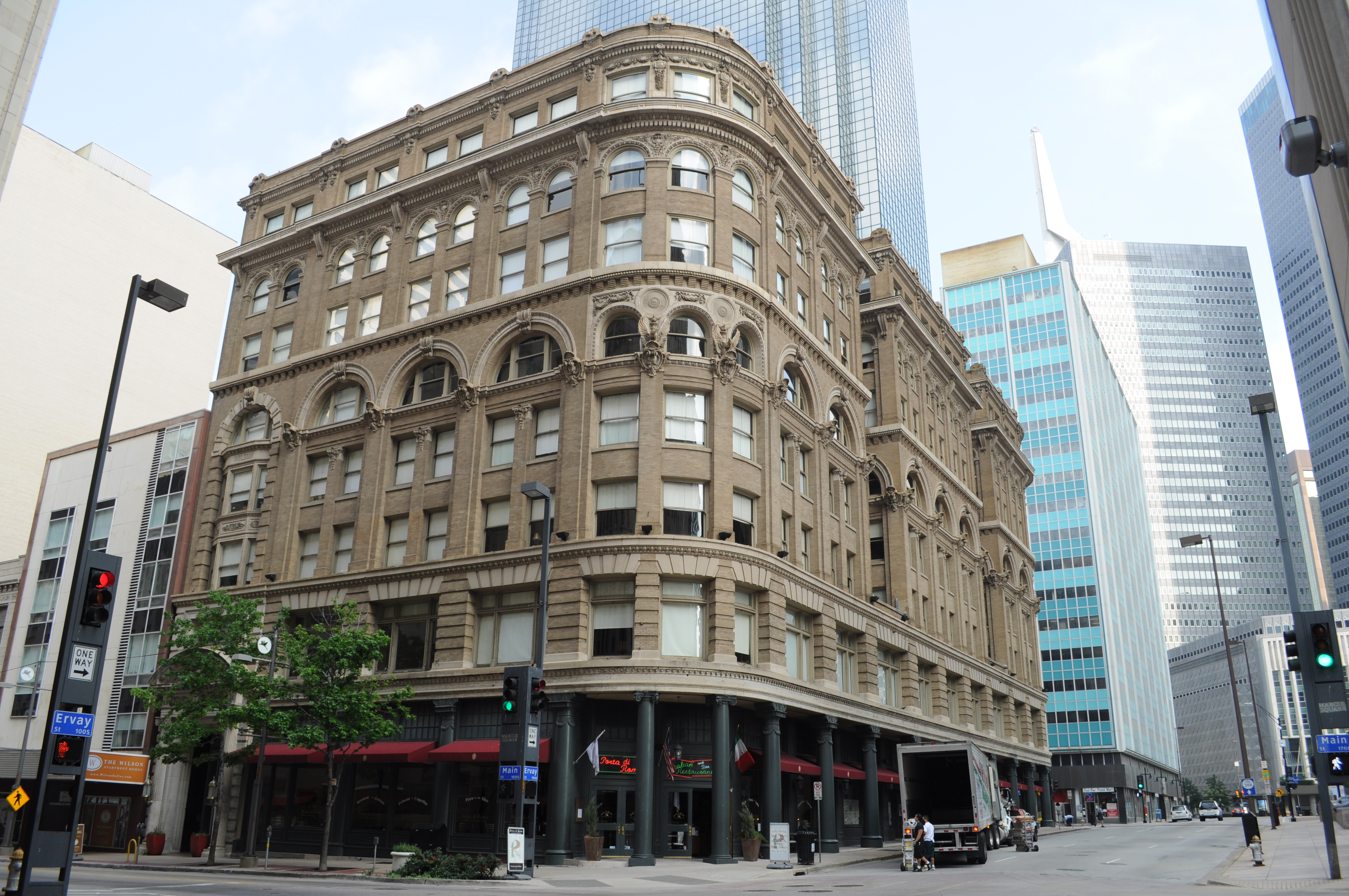
- Wilson Building in 2011

- Location within Texas Location within the United States
- Location: 1621-1623 Main St., Dallas, Texas
- Coordinates: 32°46′53″N 96°47′49″W
- Area: 1.5 acres (0.61 ha)
- Built: 1903
- Architect: A. Watson, Sanguinet & Staats
- Architectural style: Late 19th and 20th Century Revivals, French Renaissance
- Part of: Dallas Downtown Historic District (ID04000894)
- NRHP reference No.: 79002931

Significant dates
- Added to NRHP: July 24, 1979
- Designated CP: August 11, 2006

The Wilson Building is a historic 8-story building in the Main Street district of downtown Dallas, Texas. The building was completed in 1904 and patterned after the Palais Garnier in Paris, France. The historic structure fronts Main Street on the south, Ervay Street on the east, and Elm Street on the north. The Wilson building was the tallest structure in Dallas from 1904 to 1909 and was considered the premier commercial structure west of the Mississippi. The Wilson Building is situated across from the flagship Neiman Marcus Building and is adjacent to the Mercantile National Bank Building.

== History ==
The building was built for John B. Wilson (1847–1920), who moved from Canada to Dallas with his brother Frederick P. Wilson, and together made their fortune in cattle during the 19th century. Designed by Sanguinet & Staats of Fort Worth, the plan of the building is E-shaped with rounded corners featuring intricate stone and brick work. The building contained nine elevators: two for the department store and seven for office tenants. Among its many luxuries, it was connected to a 1,500 ft deep artesian well and contained 2 telegraph offices.

The structure originally housed the Titche-Goettinger Department Store (later known as Titche's) in the basement and first two levels; the upper levels housed offices accessed through a lobby on Main Street. Prior to the building's opening, most of Dallas retail traffic was centered several blocks to the west. The success of the Wilson Building and Titche-Goettinger convinced Neiman Marcus to build their flagship store across Main Street and forever changed the city's retailing history.

=== Expansion ===
In 1911, a 12-story addition was completed along Elm Street, generally matching the style of the original building. This structure was used by Titche-Goettinger and was said to be the tallest building in the South occupied exclusively by a retail establishment.

Titche-Goettinger remained the largest tenant until 1929, when it moved to the larger Titche-Goettinger Building two blocks east. The Wilson building's office space was renovated to provide accommodations for medical offices, an arcade was constructed to connect Elm Street and Main Street entrances. The W.A. Green department store moved into the tower space formerly occupied by Titche-Goettinger, while the H.L. Green Variety Store moved into the lower floors of the main building. When W.A. Green moved out in 1961, H.L. Green took over that space as well. The store became a fixture in downtown Dallas for several decades, and its lunch counter was the city's first to be integrated during the 1960s.

As the offices vacated for newer buildings the upper levels of the building became vacant and the outside was notoriously grimy, although the building was added to the National Register of Historic Places in 1979. In 1997 H.L. Green closed its doors after nearly 70 years of operating from the Wilson Building.

=== Adaptive Reuse ===
The building was owned by actress Pia Zadora for several years. The store's closure resulted in a redevelopment opportunity, and the City of Dallas acquired the building for $3.4 million (~$6 million in 2024) in 1999. Post Properties then leased the building from the city and converted the historic structure into 143 loft apartments, featuring hardwood floors and a rooftop sky terrace. The property was sold to Forest City Enterprises in 2008 to become part of the Mercantile Place on Main development, and residents share building amenities in the neighboring Mercantile Bank Building. Forest City followed through with their promise to spend "a little money" and deferred significant amounts of maintenance costs (which they passed to Brookfield Properties in 2018 when the property was again sold).

== Gallery ==
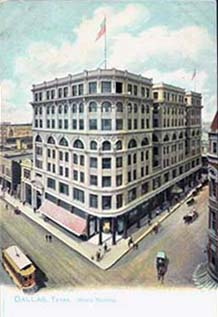
A c. 1910 postcard of the Wilson Building

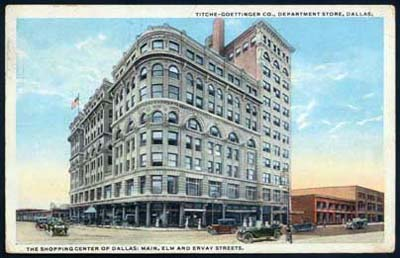
A c. 1918 postcard of the Wilson Building

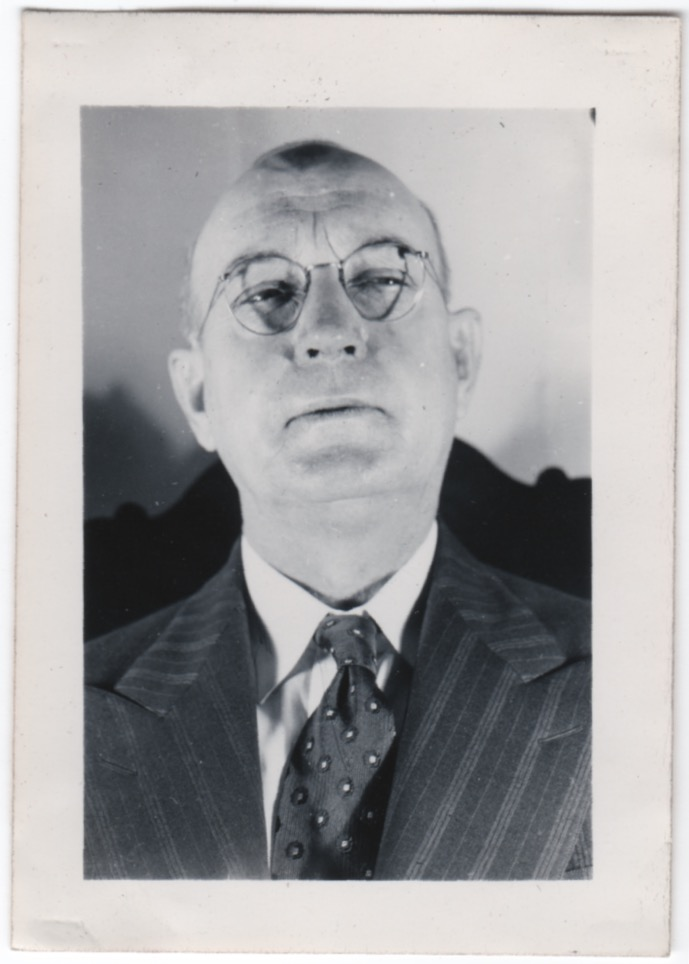
The Wilson Building was constructed for John B. Wilson

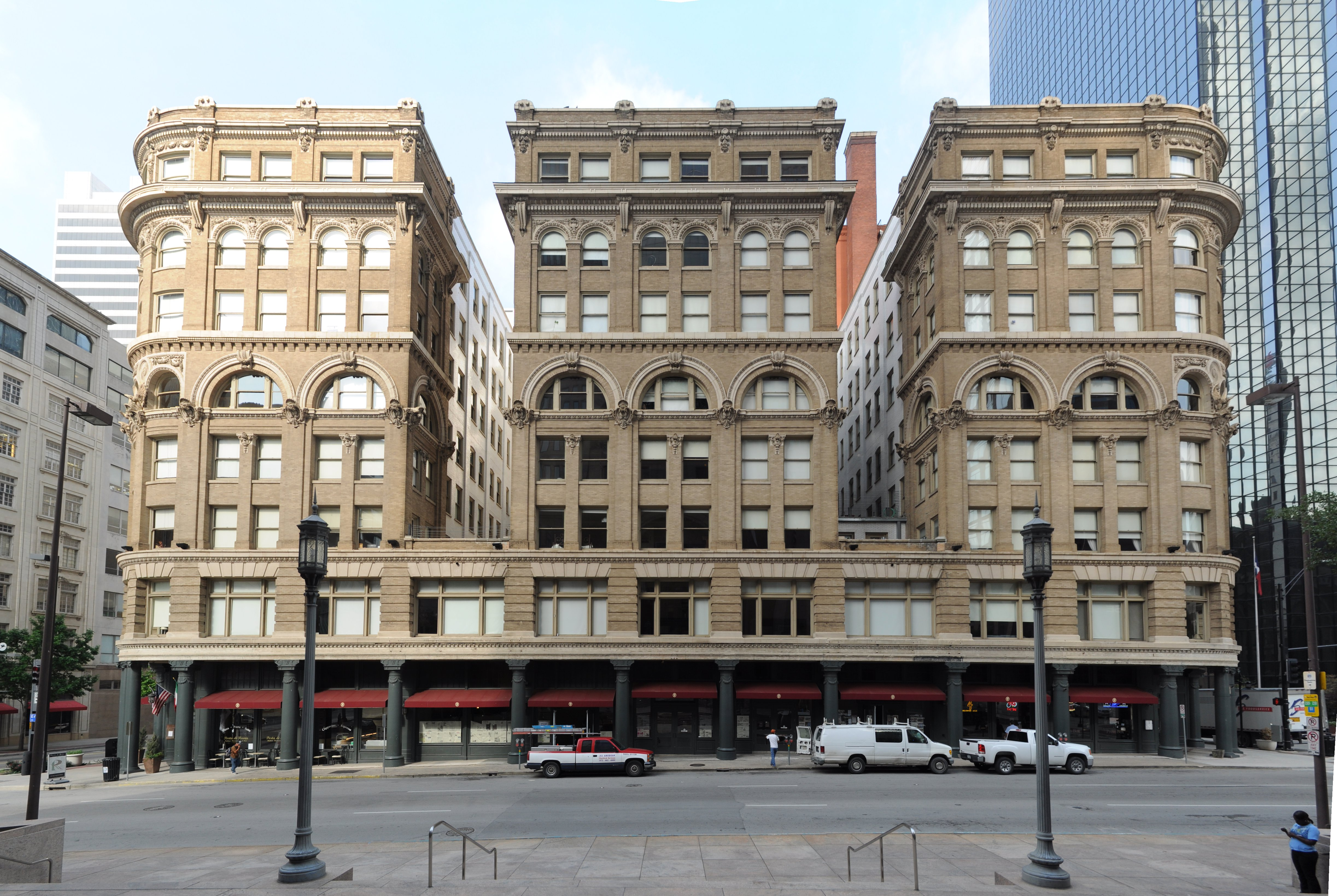
Panoramic view

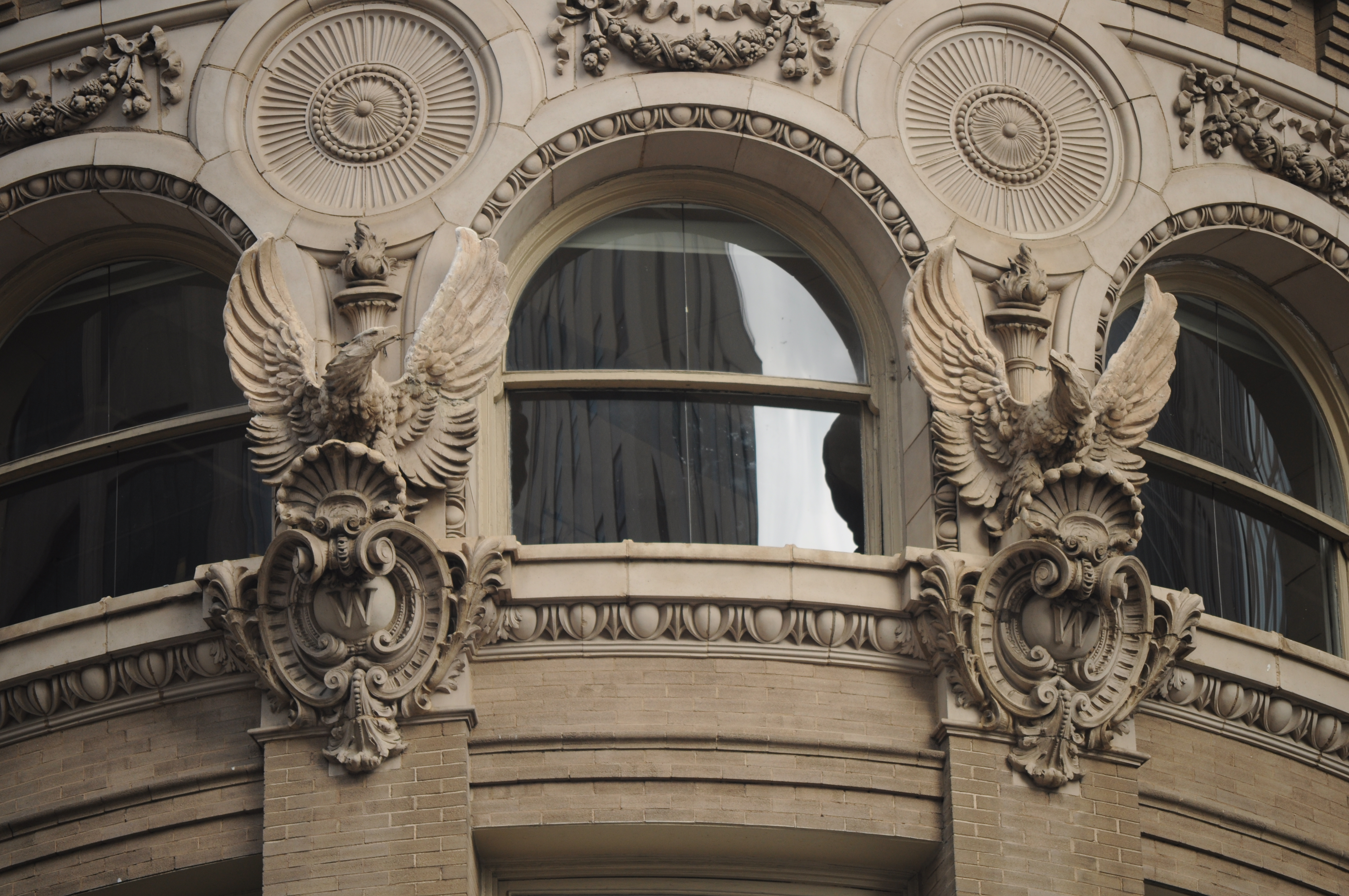
detail view

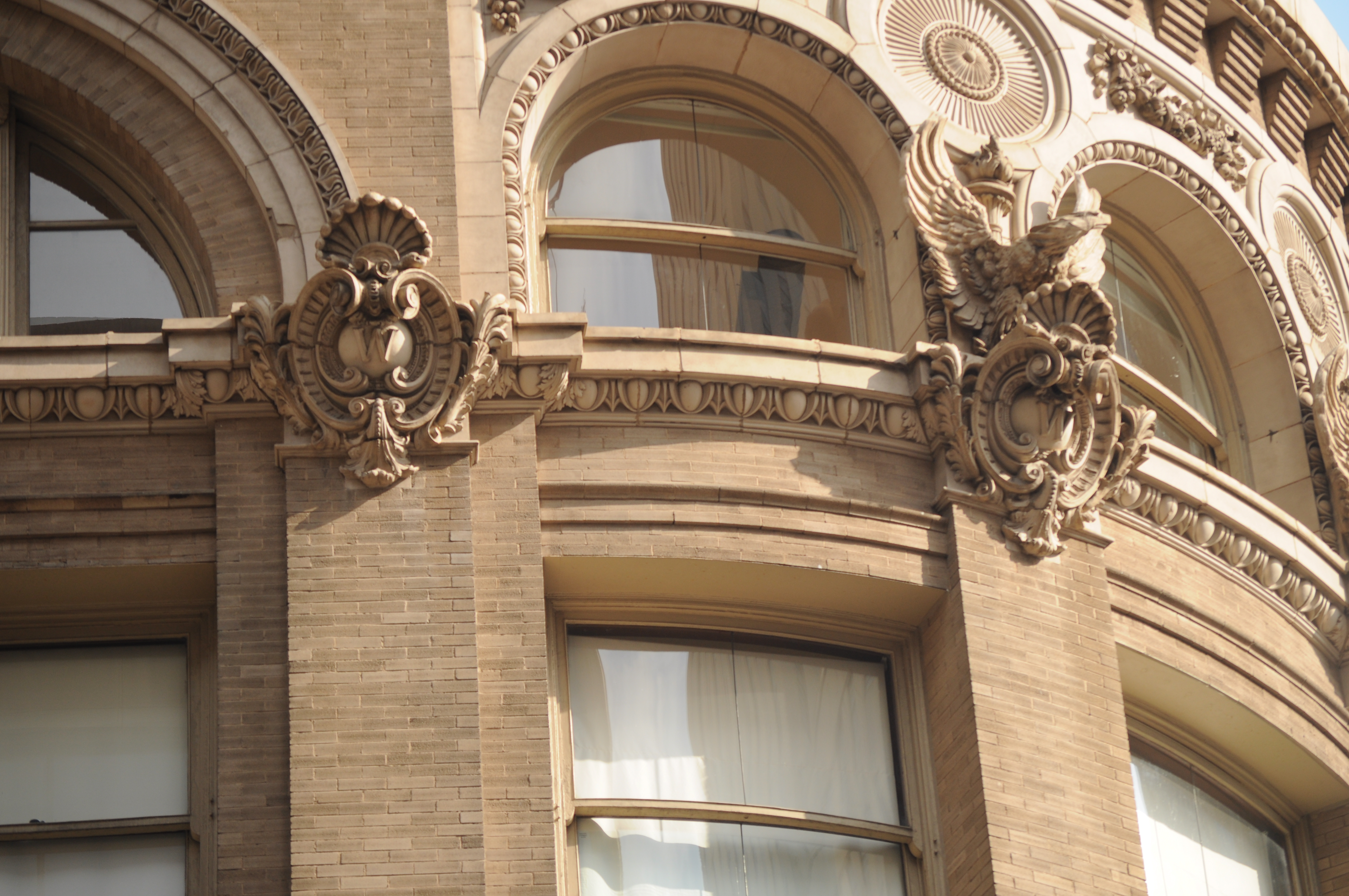
detail view

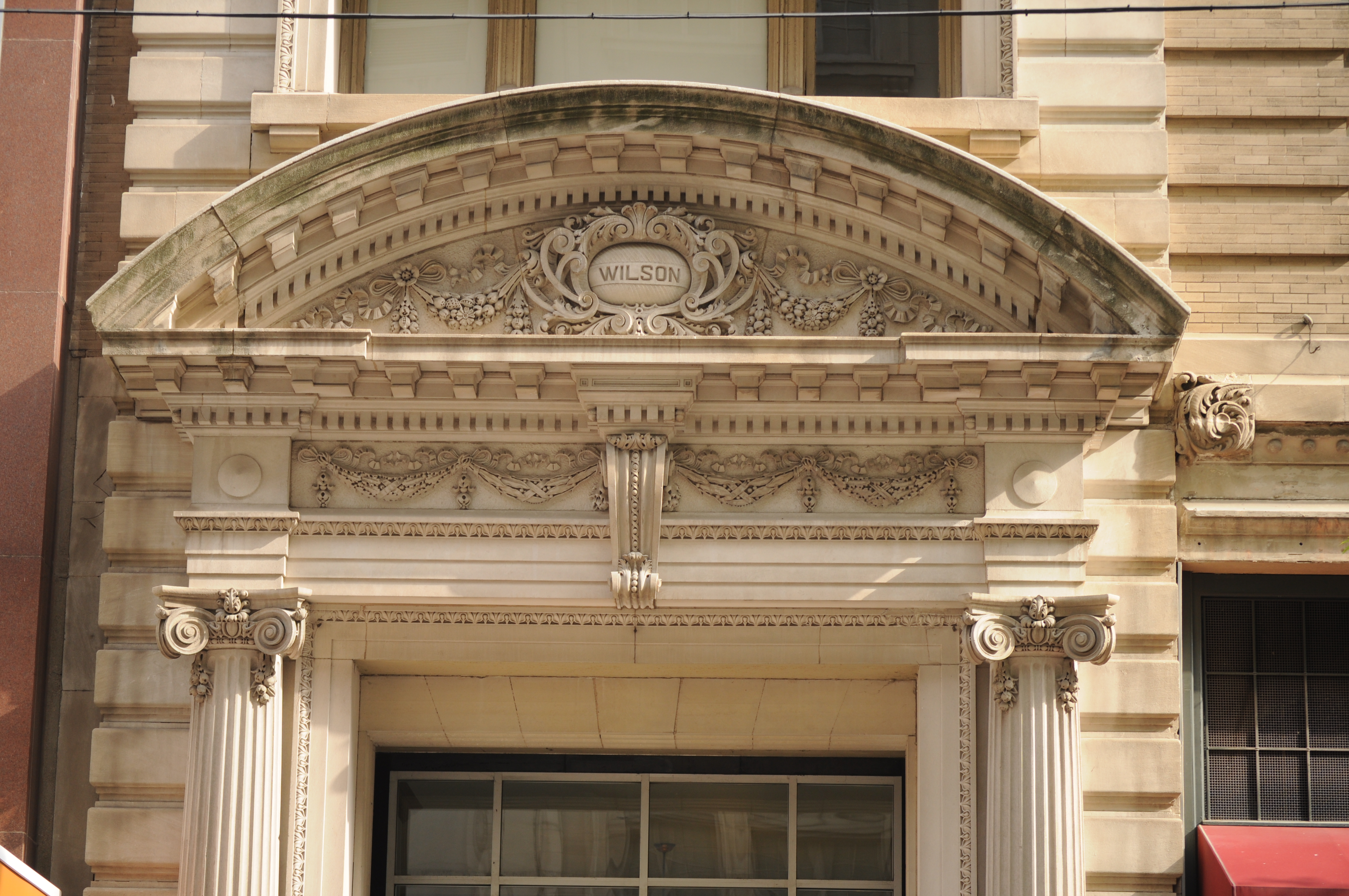
detail view

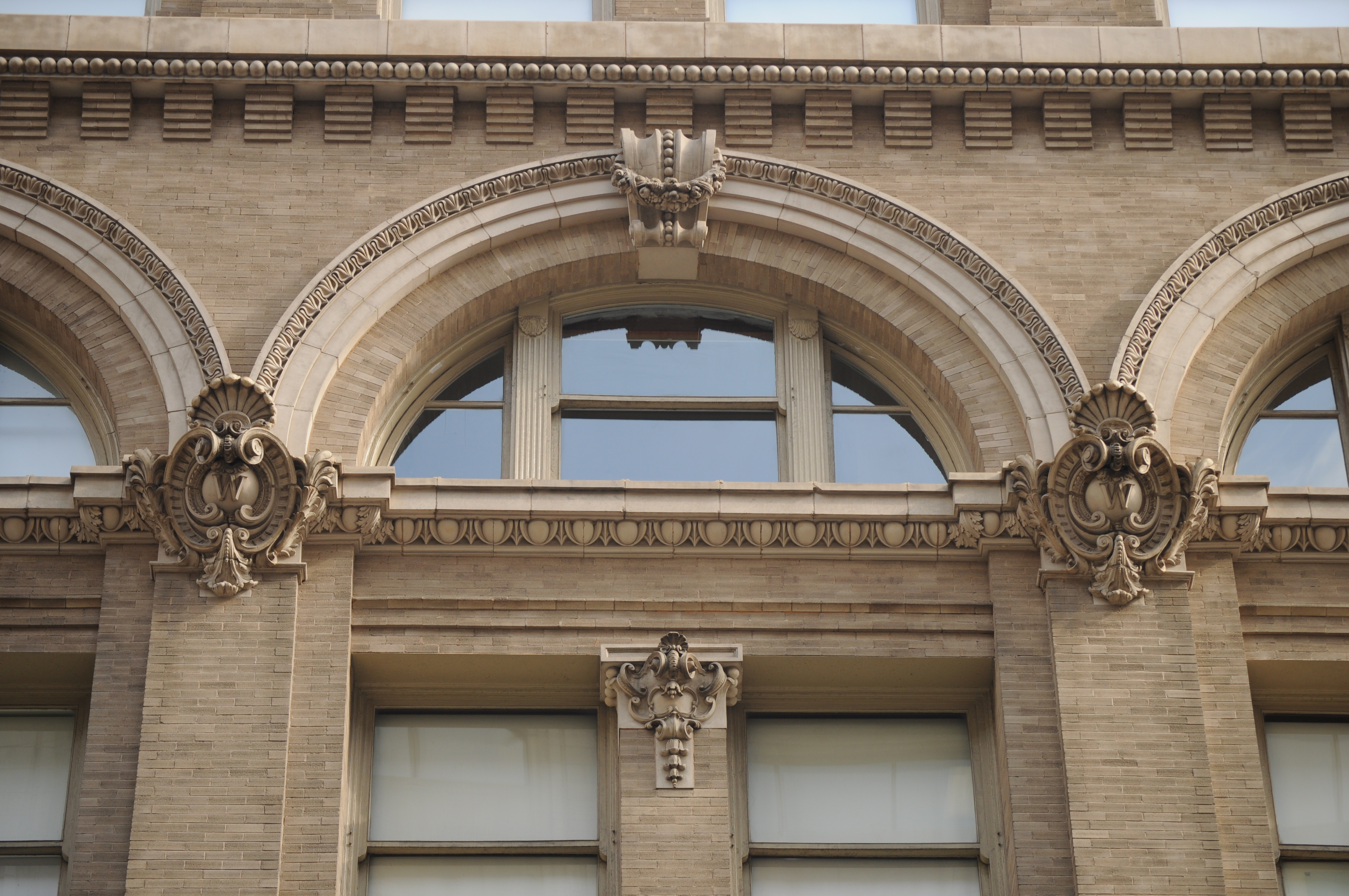
detail view

== See also ==
- National Register of Historic Places listings in Dallas County, Texas
- Mercantile National Bank Building
