= TM Advertising =

Advertising agency

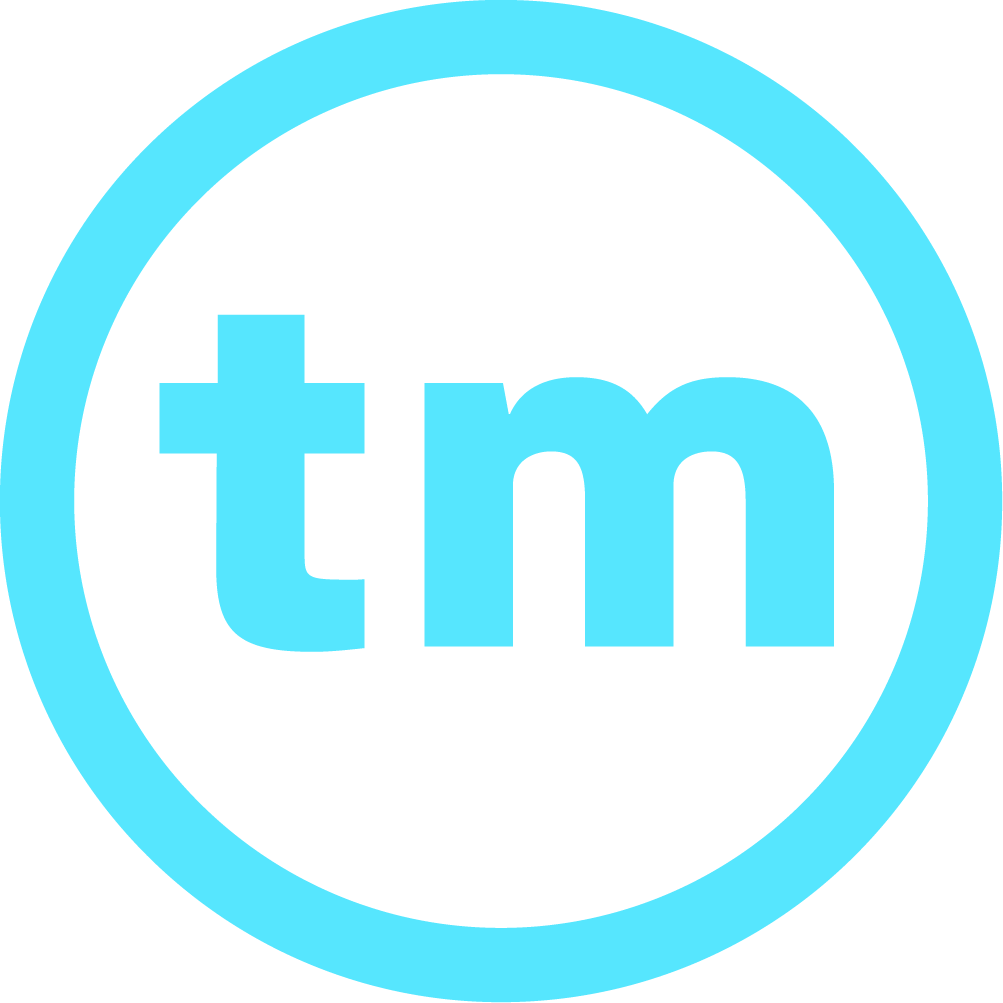
- Industry: Advertising, Marketing
- Founded: 1934
- Defunct: 2019
- Headquarters: Dallas, TX, U.S.
- Number of locations: 1
- Key people: Becca Weigman, Chief Executive Officer Lisa Bennett, Chief Creative Officer Tyler Beck, Chief Strategy Officer Kim Moss, Chief Media Officer Jeff Kempf, Chief Digital Officer
- Services: Brand management, Marketing strategy, Creative development, Direct marketing, Public relations, Digital marketing, Production

TM Advertising was an independent brand creative agency in Dallas, Texas. It closed down in 2019 after 85 years in business.

== History ==
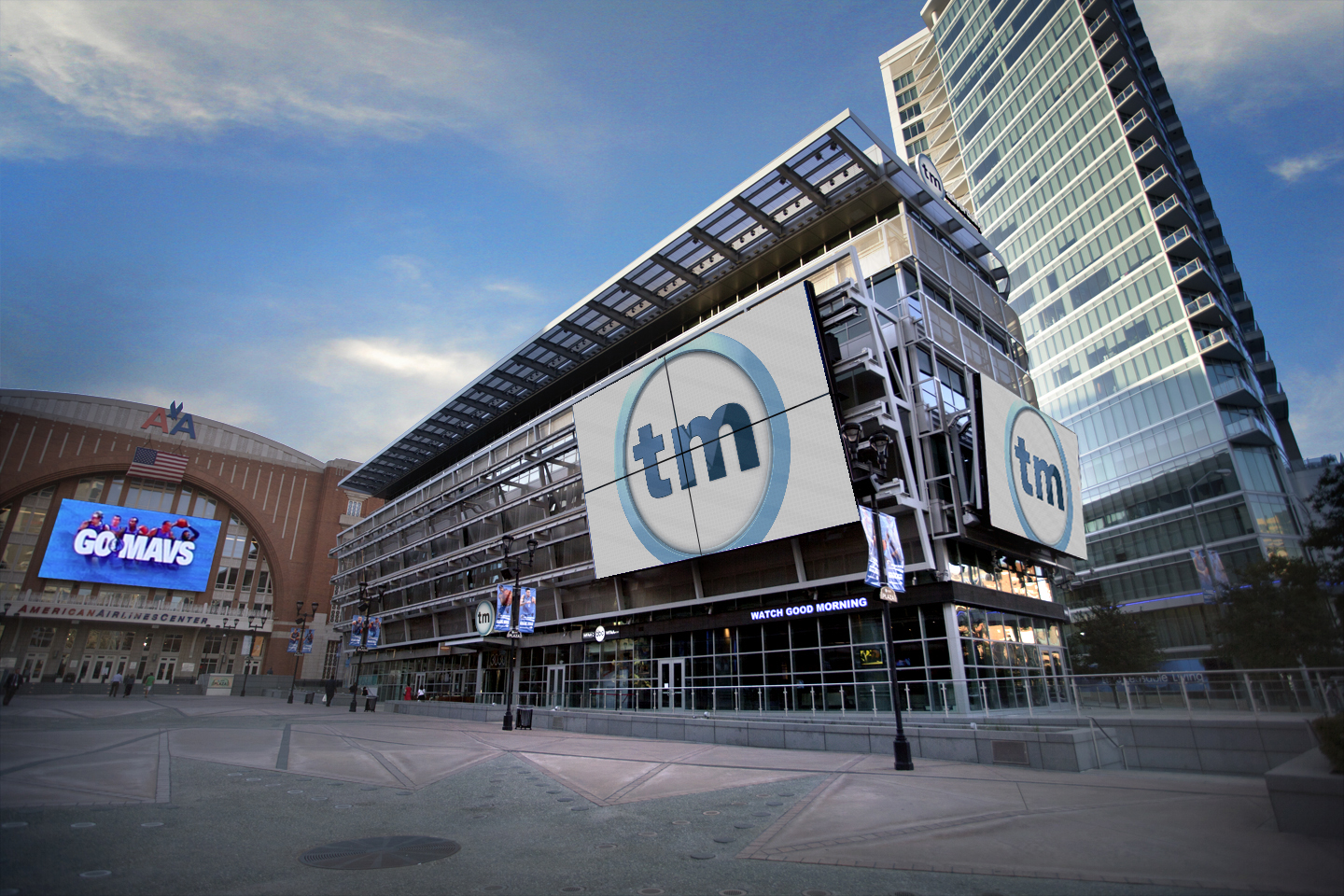
TM headquarters in Dallas

The company was founded in 1934 as Glenn Advertising, which was then renamed to Glenn, Bozell & Jacobs in 1973. It later became Bozell Dallas before becoming Temerlin McClain in 1992. In 2001, TM Advertising became a part of the Interpublic Group of Companies. Later in 2004, the name Temerlin McClain was shortened to just TM.

In May 2017, Chief Executive Officer Becca Weigman purchased the agency from Interpublic Group; Weigman stated that the firm was the first and only independent, female-owned, brand creative agency in the Dallas/Fort Worth area. Weigman, who owned a majority share in the agency, led TM Advertising with her management team: Chief Creative Officer, Lisa Bennett; Chief Media Officer, Kim Moss; Chief Strategy Officer, Tyler Beck; and Chief Digital Officer, Jeff Kempf.

== Awards and recognition ==
- Ad Age – Best Places to Work (2015, 2014, 2012)
- OAAA Media Plan of the Year (2015)
- National ADDY - Best Friends Animal Society "Afternoon Stroll" (Silver, 2013)
- National ADDY - Best Friends Animal Society "Afraid of That" (Silver, 2013)
- National ADDY - Best Friends Animal Society "Fix at Four" (Silver, 2013)
- National ADDY – American Airlines “Thank You” (Silver, 2011)
- National ADDY – American Airlines “Putting Them First” (Silver, 2011)
- National ADDY – American Airlines “Late Nate” (Silver, 2011)
- EFFIE – SuperMedia “Super Guarantee” (Bronze, 2010)
- EFFIE – Group Health “Find More Minutes (Bronze, 2010)
- Texas Society of Architects Design Award, 2012
- IIDA Texas/Oklahoma Chapter Design Excellence Honorable Mention Award, 2012
- TEXO Distinguished Building Merit Award, 2012
- World Architecture News Workspace Interiors Award Long List, 2012
