= Universities Center at Dallas =

Coordinates: 32.781787°N 96.795293°W

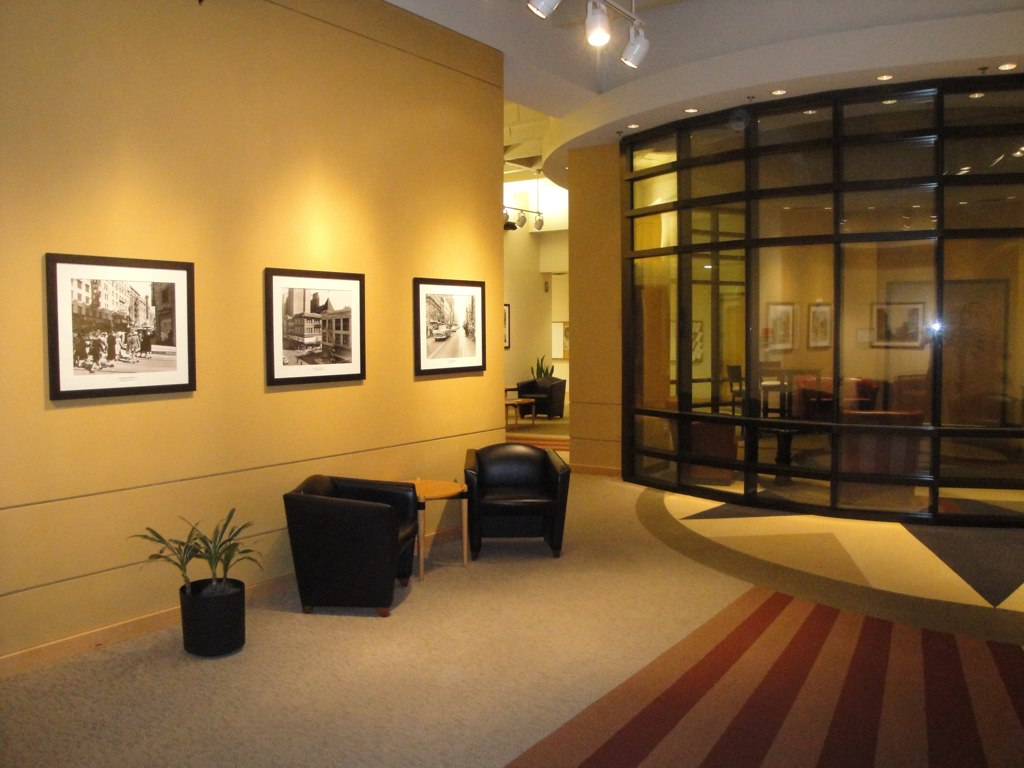
Lobby at Universities Center at Dallas, 2011

The Universities Center at Dallas is part of the UNT System. It used to be controlled by the Dallas County Community College District (DCCCD). It is located in the historic Titche-Goettinger Building in the Main Street District area of downtown Dallas, Texas, and was the first partnership of its kind in the state of Texas. These partnerships are called Multi-Institutional Teacher Centers (MITC).

The three partner universities are:

- Texas A&M University-Commerce
- University of North Texas
- University of Texas at Arlington
