= Titche–Goettinger Building =

- U.S. National Register of Historic Places
- U.S. Historic district – Contributing property
- Dallas Landmark Historic District; Contributing Property
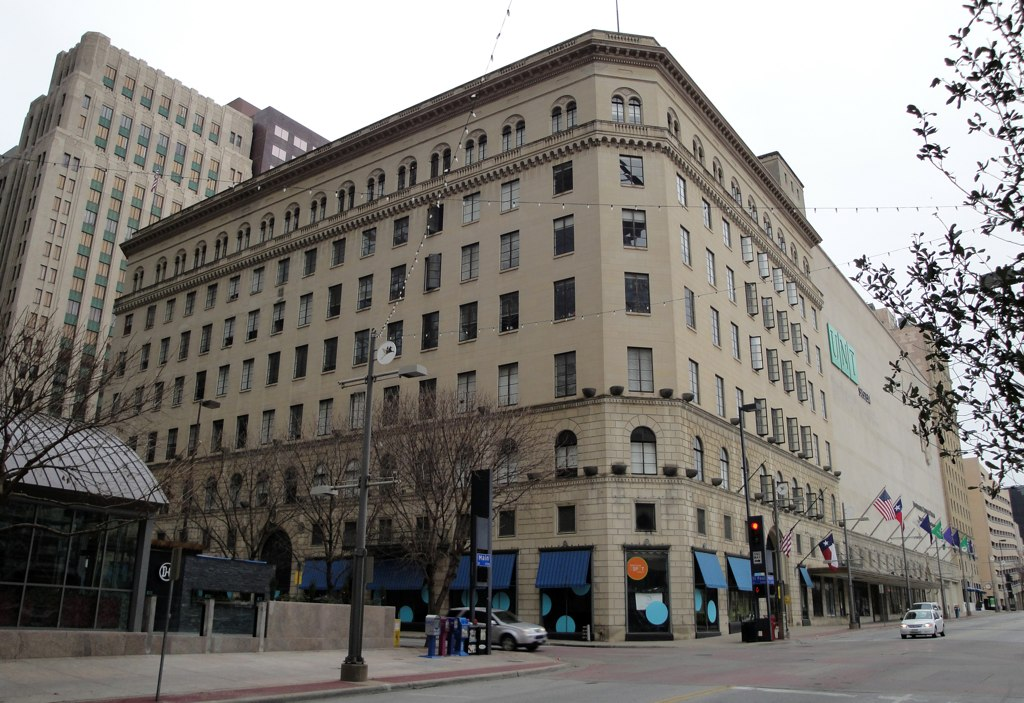
- Titche–Goettinger Building in 2010

- Location within Texas Location within the United States
- Location: 1900 Elm St. / 1901 Main St., Dallas, Texas
- Coordinates: 32°46′54″N 96°47′43″W
- Area: less than one acre
- Built: 1928
- Architect: George L. Dahl, Herbert M. Greene; Greene, LaRoche, & Dahl
- Architectural style: Renaissance
- Part of: Dallas Downtown Historic District (ID04000894)
- NRHP reference No.: 96000586
- DLMKHD No.: H/48 (Harwood HD)

Significant dates
- Added to NRHP: May 24, 1996
- Designated CP: August 11, 2006
- Designated DLMKHD: February 28, 1990

The Titche–Goettinger Building is one of Dallas' original broad-front department stores located along St. Paul Street between Main and Elm Street in downtown Dallas, Texas (USA). The structure currently houses apartments, retail space, and the Universities Center at Dallas. It is listed on the National Register of Historic Places both individually and as a contributing property in the Dallas Downtown Historic District and is a Dallas Landmark as part of the Harwood Street Historic District. It is also located across the street from Main Street Garden Park.

== History ==
In 1902, Edward Titche formed a partnership with Max Goettinger and the two established Titche–Goettinger, a department store, on the southeast corner of Elm and Murphy Streets in downtown Dallas. By 1904, operations had outgrown the Elm/Murphy location and the store moved to the year-old Wilson Building. By 1928, the store had again outgrown itself and construction began on a new building two blocks east in an area known as "Uptown".

Located along St. Paul between Elm and Main, the new flagship building designed by architect George Dahl opened in November 1929 as one of the largest department stores in the Southwest. It consisted of seven floors plus basement and sub-basement. The exterior was clad in Indiana Limestone with Italian Florentine detail in Renaissance Revival style, while the inside featured Art Deco design elements.

The interior of the building was set up like current department stores of its day. The basement was used as a retail space featuring "popularly priced" merchandise. The first floor sold impulse goods such as gloves, hats, purses and hosiery. It featured a patterned terrazzo floor and eighteen foot ornamental ceiling. Columns had ornamental capitals with Texas-motifs. The second floor sold women's and misses' clothes as well as furs and featured differently themed "galleries". Children's clothes and lingerie were located on the third floor, originally decorated with peach and apricot colors. House wares such as rugs, draperies, and furniture were on the fourth floor. The fifth floor featured glass ware and china, and the employee restrooms and hospital. The offices were on the sixth floor. On the seventh floor was a 600-seat auditorium that could also be converted into four small conference spaces. A basement and sub-basement held the mechanical equipment as well as a state-of-the-art refrigerated fur vault that could hold up to 3,000 fur coats. The cooling system cooled the basement and first floor.

=== Expansion ===
In 1955 the building doubled in size with the opening of a "Texas-size" major addition along Main between St Paul and Harwood designed by Thomas, Jameson & Merrill. This addition matched the original building in height, depth and building materials, although the façade was windowless and featured a large cartouche and prominent signage. The addition also boasted the first complete escalator service for a building of its size in the Southwest and the largest plate glass windows at street level. The expanded 500,000-square-foot (46,000 m^{2}) department store boasted three restaurants, a bakery and a 1,600-seat public auditorium.

In the 1960s and '70s the chain was more well known as Titche's.

The store took on the Joske's name in 1979. In 1985 Allied Stores consolidated Joske's three Texas divisions, and the top three floors of the building were converted to corporate offices. The store connected its retail concourse to the expanding Dallas Pedestrian Network during a renovation of the basement, first and second floors in 1986. When Dillard's bought the assets of Joske's in 1987, the historic downtown building was not included in the sale; the store was closed soon after.

=== Adaptive reuse ===
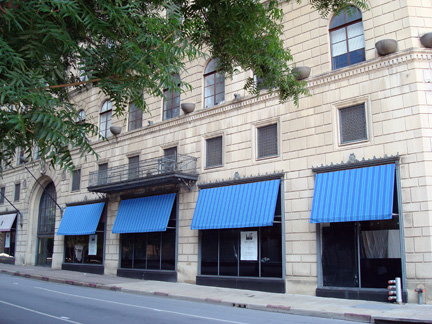
The St. Paul Street store front of the original 1929 building

In 1994, developer Graham Greene and architect Meckfessel Associates renovated the 1955 addition as the Dallas Education Center (now known as the Universities Center at Dallas). The UCD was the first multi-institutional teaching center (MITC) for higher education in Texas and was established by the Texas Higher Education Coordinating Board to provide access to public higher education at the upper division and graduate levels to citizens who live and work in downtown Dallas. Four of the seven floors have been converted to classroom space and are used by Texas A&M University-Commerce, Texas Woman's University (TWU), University of North Texas (UNT), University of Texas at Arlington (UTA), Dallas County Community College District (DCCCD) and 9th-12th grade of the Pegasus School of Liberal Arts & Sciences. The facility also contains Fashion on Main, the exhibition facility of UNT's Texas Fashion Collection. Future plans include expansion of the fashion gallery. The current address for this portion of the building is 1901 Main.

The building was listed on the U.S. National Register of Historic Places in 1996.

As one of the first residential renovations in downtown Dallas, Oglesby-Green adapted the original 1929 building into 129 loft-style apartments and retail space in 1997. To provide adequate light to interior apartments a section of the building on floors 2-8 was cut away, but the façade was left intact (this is evident when viewing the rows of open windows along Main). The eighth floor of apartments is the old "attic" space facing the interior courtyard and is only accessible via stairs from the seventh floor. Resident parking is accommodated in the basement and sub-basement levels. Many of the original finishes were incorporated into the renovation where practical, making each unit unique in design (units feature original windows and decorative columns, and one unit incorporates the old ballroom's stage). The lobby features many historical photographs and artifacts of the building's past. For several years in the late 1990s a portion of the lobby contained the Gold Bar and restaurant Champagne; vestiges still remain of old bar and department store features throughout the building. The current address for this portion of the building is 1900 Elm.

UNT purchased the Universities Center at 1901 Main with plans to expand program offerings. Because the building shares parking and other critical services with 1900 Elm, UNT also purchased the apartment building and offers a reduced rate to full-time students, thus reunifying the historic building under one ownership.

On May 14, 2009, the Texas Legislature approved UNT's request for a public law school in the neighboring Dallas Municipal Building. The Universities Center will be home of the new law school until the renovated building is ready for occupancy.

== Design details ==
The 96,000 pound cartouche is a prominent feature of the 1955 addition.

- The prominent cartouche on the 1955 addition became a symbol of the Titche–Goettinger company and can be found in other areas of the building. It is made of solid Indiana limestone and stands 28 feet high by 26 feet across, covering part of the building's fifth, sixth and seventh floors. The design was created by the architectural firm of Thomas Jameson and Merrill. The carving was done by Ingalls Stone Company in Bedford, IN under the direction of Enrico Liva, chief carver. The center portion is topped by a star signifying the Lone Star State and Titche's place in it. On each side of the star are live oak leaves mixed in with cactus blossoms. Below the star on the left is a scale indicating full measure and value. On the right, a ship indicating the world of commerce. Nine cotton bolls are indicative of Texas farm life and the textile industry, and on the right are the initials of the store. The six national flags of Texas are shown, representing the United States, Confederacy, France, (on the left) Texas, Mexico and Spain (on the right).
- Above the entrance doors are relief sculptures of important Dallas leaders and businessmen.
- The 1929 building was once lit by a series of multi-colored lights. These light sconces can still be seen along the building façade but are not in use today.
- On either side of the entry doors are medallions representing Texas commerce. At the St. Paul (west) entrance are designs of cotton and wheat, representing the two main agricultural crops of the state. At the Elm Street (north) entrance, timber and manufacturing are featured and at the Main Street (south) entrance cattle and oil are shown.

== Zoned schools ==
Residents are zoned to schools in the Dallas Independent School District. Zoned schools include City Park Elementary School, Billy Earl Dade Middle School, and James Madison High School.

== See also ==
- National Register of Historic Places listings in Dallas County, Texas
- List of Dallas Landmarks
