= Berryman =

Berryman may refer to:

- BLIT (short story), or Berryman Logical Image Technique, a short story by David Langford
- Berryman, Missouri, an unincorporated community

People:

- Clifford K. Berryman, (1869–1949), American political cartoonist whose work spawned the Teddy bear
- Doris L. Berryman (1926–2000), American college professor
- Dorothée Berryman (born 1948), Canadian actress and singer
- Sir Frank Berryman (1894–1981), Australian soldier
- Guy Berryman (born 1978), musician of the group Coldplay
- James T. Berryman, (1902–1971), American political cartoonist
- Jim Berryman (born 1947), American politician from Michigan
- John Berryman (1914–1972), American poet
- John Berryman (VC) (1825–1896), English serviceman and recipient of the Victoria Cross
- Lou and Peter Berryman, American folk singer-songwriters
- Michael Berryman (born 1948), American character actor
- Mildred J. "Berry" Beryman (1901–1972), American LGBT scholar
- Paul Berryman, musician of Australian rock band The Superjesus
- Phillip Berryman (born 1938), American theologian and author
- William Berryman, 19th-century English artist active in Jamaica
- Berryman Henwood (1881–1955), justice of the Supreme Court of Missouri

== See also ==
- Berriman (surname)
