= Drebin =

Drebin is a surname. Notable people with the surname include:

- Frank Drebin, a fictional police officer played by Leslie Nielsen
- Jeffrey Drebin, American surgeon and scientist
- Drebin, a fictional arms dealer in the Metal Gear franchise
