= Breitbart (surname) =

Breitbart is a surname of German or Yiddish origin, meaning "broad beard" in both languages. Notable people with the surname include:

- Andrew Breitbart (1969–2012), American web publisher and news commentator
- William Breitbart (born 1951), American psychiatrist
- Zishe Breitbart (1883–1925), Polish-Jewish circus strongman
