= Jimmie C. Holland =

American psychiatrist

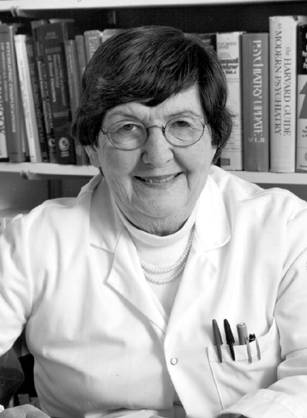
- Born: Jimmie Coker; April 9, 1928; Nevada, Texas
- Died: December 24, 2017 (aged 89); Scarsdale, New York
- Occupations: Psychiatrist, medical researcher
- Known for: Founder of psycho-oncology

Jimmie Coker Holland (April 9, 1928 – December 24, 2017) was a founder of the field of psycho-oncology. In 1977, she worked with two colleagues to establish a full-time psychiatric service at Memorial Sloan Kettering Cancer Center. The program was one of the first of its kind in cancer treatment, and trained its psychologists to specialize in issues specific to people with cancer.

== Biography ==
Born in Nevada, Texas, in 1928, Holland earned her medical degree from Baylor College of Medicine in Houston, Texas, in 1952, and received her board certification in psychiatry in 1966. She taught and practiced at the State University of New York, Buffalo, and Montefiore Hospital of Albert Einstein College of Medicine in New York City. Holland was chief of the Psychiatry Service, which she helped create, for New York's Memorial Sloan-Kettering (MSK) Cancer Center from 1977 to 1996. The Psychiatry Service at MSK was the first ever clinical, research and training service established at a cancer center. She became a Professor of Psychiatry at the Weill Cornell Medical College, and held the Wayne E. Chapman Chair of Psychiatric Oncology at MSK. During her years at MSK, Holland created the nation's largest training and research program in psycho-oncology. In 1996, she was named the inaugural Chairwoman of the Department of Psychiatry and Behavioral Sciences at Memorial Sloan Kettering Cancer Center, the first ever department of its kind.

Holland founded the American Psychosocial Oncology Society (formerly known as the American Society of Psychosocial and Behavioral Oncology/AIDS) in 1980, and co-founded the International Psycho-Oncology Society (IPOS) in 1984. She is also credited with putting psychosocial and behavioral research on the agenda of the American Cancer Society (ACS) in the early 1980s.

In 1994, Dr. Holland was awarded the American Cancer Society's Medal of Honor for Clinical Research. The ACS awarded her its Medal of Honor for Clinical Research in 1994. She was elected a Fellow in the Institute of Medicine of the National Academy of Sciences in 1995, and received the Presidential Commendation from the American Psychiatric Association in 2000, among many other awards.

In 1984, she produced for Sloan-Kettering the first syllabus on psycho-oncology and, in 1989, was senior editor of the first textbook on the subject. In 1992, Holland became co-editor of the journal Psycho-Oncology, along with Dr. Maggie Watson from the Royal Marsden Hospital. Dr. Holland not only has had a huge influence in her research of Psycho-Oncology, but she has also written a book named, "The Human Side of Cancer". The book has helped aid patients with cancer and support systems cope with the diagnosis.

Her husband, James F. Holland, was an oncologist and an important figure in the early development of cancer chemotherapy. Her interest in the field of psycho-oncology arose in part from discussions with her husband about the patients he treated, and the understanding that arose from those discussions that little was known about the experiences of people with cancer and that little was being done to help people with cancer manage the experience.

Holland died of complications of cardiovascular disease on December 24, 2017, at the age of 89.

== See also ==
- William Breitbart
- Psycho-oncology
