= Alex Kentsis =

Scientist and physician (b. 1975)

Alex Kentsis (born Oleg Emilievich Kentsis, 1975) is an American scientist and physician at the Memorial Sloan Kettering Cancer Center and Weill Medical College of Cornell University, known for his contributions to understanding biological self-organization, cell signaling, cancer biology, and cancer therapeutics.

== Personal life ==
Kentsis was born in 1975 in Chișinău, in the Moldavian SSR of the Soviet Union (now Moldova). Escaping antisemitism, his family emigrated to USA in 1989. He is married to Nina Kentsis (née Shapiro), a researcher and writer, and they have two children.

== Education and career ==
Kentsis received his Bachelor's degree (AB) in Biological Sciences and Master's degree (SM) in Biochemistry from the University of Chicago. He went on to earn his Doctor of Medicine (MD) and Doctor of Philosophy (PhD) in Biophysics from the Mount Sinai School of Medicine of New York University (now Icahn School of Medicine at Mount Sinai). He completed his clinical training in pediatrics at the Boston Children's Hospital and pediatric hematology-oncology at the Dana-Farber Cancer Institute at the Harvard Medical School.

In 2013, he joined the faculty of the Memorial Sloan Kettering Cancer Center, where he is currently Member of the Sloan Kettering Institute and Professor of Pediatrics, Pharmacology, and Physiology & Biophysics, and founding Director of the Tow Center for Developmental Oncology.

== Research ==
As a student with Tobin Sosnick, Kentsis contributed to understanding protein folding, including effects of hydration now used in molecular design. As a student with Katherine Borden, Kentsis used protein engineering approaches to investigate cellular scaffolds and defined a distinct mechanism of protein self-assembly relevant to various physiological processes. His work on the promyelocytic leukemia (PML) nuclear body supported the development of ribavirin for cancer therapy.

Kentsis has advocated for the use of biological mass spectrometry and proteomics for the discovery of disease biomarkers and therapeutic targets. His work with Thomas Look investigated the mechanisms of autocrine receptor tyrosine kinase signaling in acute myeloid leukemias, contributing to the general mechanism of adaptive cancer therapy resistance by feedback activation, alongside similar studies by Neal Rosen, Todd Golub, and Jeff Engelman, leading to clinical trials for patients. Subsequently, his laboratory has elucidated genetic and epigenetic mechanisms of chemotherapy resistance and therapies targeting oncogenic transcription factors.

Since 2015, Kentsis' research in childhood cancer biology identified developmental mechanisms of site-specific oncogenic mutations. This established the concept of developmental mutators, proposing a unified theory of why specific cancers develop in young people. In 2026, Kentsis and collaborators reported that the developmental mutator PGBD5 also contributes to healthy brain development in mice and humans, and associated inherited PGBD5 deficiency with a neurodevelopmental disability disorder.

His book Developmental Oncology: Principles and Therapy of Cancers of Children and Young Adults with Alejandro Gutierrez advanced the concept of developmental oncology, a framework that redefined cancers of childhood and young adulthood as diseases rooted in distinct developmental cell states and early‑life mutational processes.

== Awards and honors ==
- Burroughs Wellcome Fund Career Award for Medical Scientists (2013)
- Scholar Award, American Society of Hematology (2014)
- Scholar Award, Rita Allen Foundation (2016)
- Clinical Investigator Award, Damon Runyon Cancer Research Foundation (2016)
- St. Baldrick's Foundation Robert J. Arceci Innovation Award (2018)
- Investigator Award, Society for Pediatric Research (2018)
- Elected Member, American Society for Clinical Investigation (2018)
- Scholar Award, Leukemia and Lymphoma Society (2019)
- Pershing Square Sohn Prize (2019)
- Boyer Clinical Research Award (2020)
