= Berriman =

Berriman is a surname. Notable people with the surname include:

- Fred Berriman (1879–1945), British politician
- John Berriman (1691–1768), English clergyman and scholar, brother of William
- William Berriman (1688–1750), English theologian

== See also ==
- Berryman (disambiguation)
