= Esther Babady =

Congolese-American microbiologist

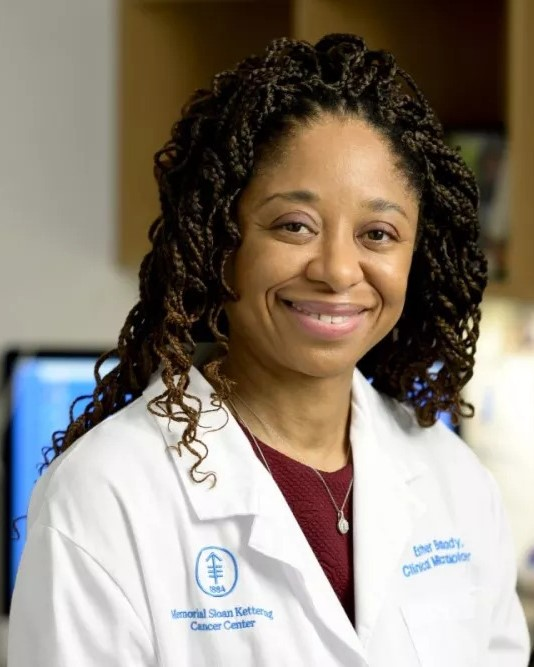
- Born: Esther Ngolela Babady; Democratic Republic of the Congo
- Education: Mayo Clinic College of Medicine and Science
- Scientific career
- Workplaces: Memorial Sloan Kettering Cancer Center
- Thesis: Identification and Characterization of the Proteolytic Activity of Dihydrolipoamide Dehydrogenase (2007)

Esther Ngolela Babady is a Congolese-born American microbiologist currently serving as chief of the Memorial Sloan Kettering Cancer Center's Clinical Microbiology Service and President of the Pan American Society for Clinical Virology.

== Education ==
Babady attended the Mayo Clinic College of Medicine and Science for her doctoral studies in biochemistry and molecular biology and post-doctoral studies in clinical microbiology.

== Career and research ==
After receiving her Ph.D in biochemestry and molecular biology, Babady then completed her post doctoral in clinical microbiology. Since 2011, Babady has worked at the Memorial Sloan Kettering Cancer Center, serving as chief of its Clinical Microbiology Service since April 2021 and Director of its Clinical Microbiology Fellowship Program. Her research has largely focused on diagnostic microbiology in immunocompromised hosts.

In early 2020, Babady developed the first Food and Drug Administration-authorized COVID-19 test used in New York City. Her team also developed a saliva test with sensitivity matching nasopharyngeal swabs, minimizing exposure to healthcare workers. In recognition of her work, Babady was named on Crain's New York Business' 2021 Empire BCBS Whole Health Heroes list.

In 2019, Babady was elected as a fellow of the Infectious Diseases Society of America. In June 2019, she became the inaugural co-chair of the Fungal Diagnostics Laboratory Consortium. In February 2021, she was elected as a fellow of the American Academy of Microbiology. In July 2022, Babady was appointed President of the Pan American Society for Clinical Virology for a two-year term.

In 2021, Babady began a five-year term as a Senior Editor for the academic journal Microbiology Spectrum and currently serves on the editorial boards of The Journal of Molecular Diagnostics and Journal of Clinical Virology.

In July 2023, Babady began a four-year term on the Centers for Disease Control and Prevention's Clinical Laboratory Improvement Advisory Committee.
