= Doris L. Berryman =

American college professor

- Born: Doris Luverne Berryman; June 23, 1926; Denver, Colorado, U.S.
- Died: November 3, 2000 (aged 74); New York, New York, U.S.
- Occupation: College professor

Doris Luverne Berryman (June 23, 1926 – November 3, 2000) was an American college professor and specialist in therapeutic recreation. She taught courses in leisure and recreation at New York University from 1973 to 1997.

== Early life and education ==
Berryman was born in Denver, Colorado, the daughter of Edward Hussen Berryman and Mabel Luverne Wilcox Berryman. Both of her parents were also born in Colorado. She graduated from the University of Denver, earned a master's degree at Teachers College, Columbia University, and completed doctoral studies at New York University in 1970, with a dissertation titled "A Method of Evaluating Recreation Services for Disabled Children and Youth in Institutional Treatment Settings, Based on the Establishment of Standards and Evaluative Criteria."

== Career ==
Berryman was a therapeutic recreation specialist. She was recreation at Memorial Sloan Kettering Cancer Center in the 1950s, and worked for Comeback, Inc., a program of the National Recreation Association. In 1963 she taught an extension course on recreation in Westchester County. She was a professor at New York University from 1973 until 1997, when she retired as a professor emerita. She spoke at conferences and other colleges about her work, and consulted with city parks programs. She is credited with "the first major effort to develop therapeutic recreation standards", which "served as a major reference in the development of standards through the 1970s."

Berryman was a member of the Academy of Leisure Sciences, the World Leisure & Recreation Association, the National Therapeutic Recreation Society, the Society of Park and Recreation Educators, the American Educational Research Association, and many other organizations in her field.

== Publications ==
Berryman's research was published in academic journals including; International Journal of Rehabilitation Research, Journal of Rehabilitation, Society & Leisure, World Leisure & Recreation, and Journal of Leisure Research.

- "Educational Rhythmics Proving its Worth" (1966, with Frances Arje)
- "Unemployed Young Adults: a Manpower Resource for Therapeutic Recreation" (1968)
- Enhancement of recreation service to disabled children (1971)
- Serving Disabled Children: Guidelines for Recreational Agencies (1971, with Annette Logan and Bernard Braginsky)
- Recommended standards with evaluative criteria for recreation services in residential institutions (1971)
- Development of Educational Programs for New Careers in Recreation Services for the Disabled (1971)
- "A computer based system for comprehensive activity analysis and prescriptive recreation programming for disabled children and youth" (1975, with Claudette B. Lefebvre)
- A Recreation/education Program for Disabled Children: Part 1 (1975, with Claudette B. Lefebvre and Jesse A. Mann)
- "Developmental approaches to therapeutic recreation programming: A new research focus" (1980, with Walter B. Kinney)
- "Evaluating Professional Personnel" (1980)
- "Leisure Counseling: Dimensions and Outlook" (1984, with Pierre Ouellette)
- "Problem Based Learning (PBL) as an Innovative Approach to Professional Preparation and Leadership Development in Recreation and Leisure Services" (1988, with Patricia I. Hogan)
- "The Relationship Among Self-esteem, Acculturation, and Recreation Participation of Recently Arrived Chinese Immigrant Adolescents" (1996, with Ping Yu)
- "Riding the Winds of Change" (2000)

== Personal life ==
Berryman's partner was fellow recreation professional Claudette B. Lefebvre. Berryman died from pancreatic cancer in 2000, at the age of 74, at her home in New York City. There is a box of her papers in the New York University Archives Biographical Files. The Metropolitan New York Recreation & Park Society gives an annual Doris Berryman Lifetime Achievement Award, named in her memory.
