= William Breitbart =

American psychiatrist

William S. Breitbart, MD, FAPM (born 1951) is an American psychiatrist in Psychosomatic Medicine, Psycho-oncology, and Palliative Care. He is the Jimmie C Holland Chair in Psychiatric Oncology, and the Chief of the Psychiatry Service, Department of Psychiatry and Behavioral Sciences, Memorial Sloan-Kettering Cancer Center (MSKCC) in New York City. He is a Professor of Clinical Psychiatry at Weill Medical College of Cornell University. He was president of the Academy of Psychosomatic Medicine and the editor-in-chief of Palliative and Supportive Care.

He is an attending psychiatrist in the Department of Psychiatry & Behavioral Sciences, the Palliative Care Service of the Department of Medicine at Memorial Sloan-Kettering Cancer Center and at the New York Presbyterian Hospital.

Breitbart was a founding board member of the American Psycho-Oncology Society (APOS) and the International Psycho-Oncology Society (IPOS) and a president. .

== Early life and education ==
William Breitbart was born in 1951 and raised on the Lower East Side of Manhattan with his younger brother, Sheldon. He attended Yeshiva at the Rabbi Jacob Joseph School on Henry Street before attending Stuyvesant High School.

Breitbart graduated from the Albert Einstein College of Medicine of Yeshiva University (New York, NY), and completed residencies in Internal Medicine and General Psychiatry at the Bronx Municipal Hospital Center - Jacobi Hospital. He continued his fellowship training in Psychosomatic Medicine and Psycho-oncology at Memorial Sloan-Kettering Cancer Center, receiving both a Clinical Fellowship Award (1985–1986) and a Career Development Award (1986–1989) from the American Cancer Society. Breitbart is Board Certified in Internal Medicine, Psychiatry, and Psychosomatic Medicine.

== Career and research ==
Breitbart has been the chief of psychiatry at MSKCC since 1996, and was the director of the ACGME Accredited Fellowship Training Program in Psychosomatic Medicine there. He has been vice-chairman of the Department of Psychiatry & Behavioral Sciences at MSKCC since 2009, and was named interim chairman in June 2012. In October 2014 Breitbart was appointed chairman of the Department of Psychiatry & Behavioral Sciences, and holds the Jimmie C Holland Chair in Psychiatric Oncology at MSKCC.

Breitbart's clinical role as the Consulting Psychiatrist for the Pain and Palliative Care Service at Memorial Sloan-Kettering Cancer Center led him to focus his research efforts on the psychiatric aspects of end-of-life care. He has received continuous funding for investigator initiated research since 1989, including eight National Institute of Health funded projects, four National Institute of Mental Health funded projects, four National Cancer Institute funded projects, and seven privately funded research projects.

Much of his early research focused on the neuropsychiatric problems of HIV-infected patients, including pain, fatigue, delirium and other symptoms that impact quality of life. As Breitbart's clinical experiences brought more attention to the terminally ill patients’ desire for hastened death, he began to study the psychological and psychosocial factors associated with this desire for death among the terminally ill population. Breitbart and his colleagues began to reframe the concept of despair at the end of life, expanding the concerns of palliative and supportive care beyond symptom management. In addition to constructs such as depression and anxiety, they found that factors such as hopelessness, loss of meaning, and decreased spiritual well-being contributed greatly to the dying patients’ sense of suffering. Breitbart also participates in a multi-centered research trial dealing with dignity-conserving care in palliative care settings.

Breitbart's most recent research efforts involve the development of novel psychotherapeutic interventions, which he has named "Meaning-Centered Psychotherapy", aimed at sustaining meaning and improving spiritual well-being in the terminally ill. In an interview for the international journal Innovations in End-of-Life Care, Breitbart refers to the works of existential theorists/philosophers, particularly Viktor Frankl. Frankl's meaning-based model of logotherapy and his book Man’s Search for Meaning had a significant influence on Breitbart and directed the goals of his work towards the concept of helping dying patients to maintain meaning at the end of life through "Meaning-Centered Psychotherapy".

Breitbart and colleagues have developed both an individual and group model of "Meaning-Centered Psychotherapy", inspired by Frankl's work. These novel interventions are aimed at helping patients sustain and enhance a sense of purpose and meaning in life through various psycho-education tasks, and in turn improve their overall quality of life as they encounter their mortality.

== Honors and awards ==
Breitbart was a Soros Faculty Scholar of the Open Society Institute, Project on Death in America.

He has served as a member of the board of directors of the American Pain Society and was a panel member for the American Psychiatric Association Guidelines for the Management of Delirium. He is an active member of the International Association for the Study of Pain and a panel member of the NIH Behavioral Medicine Study Section.

Breitbart has served as the president of the Academy of Psychosomatic Medicine (2007-8), as well as president of the International Psycho-oncology Society(2008–10).

Breitbart has been honored as a Plenary Lecturer at various international conferences, including the 8th World Congress on Pain, the 16th Annual American Pain Society Scientific Meeting, and the 5th World Congress of Psycho-Oncology. He is the recipient of the 2003 Research Award of the Academy of Psychosomatic Medicine, the 2006 Donald Oken Award from the American Psychosomatic Society, the 2009 Arthur Sutherland Award for lifetime achievement from the International Psycho-oncology Society, and the 2011 Eleanor & Thomas Hackett Award for Lifetime Achievement from the Academy of Psychosomatic Medicine.

In addition, Breitbart has been recognized as one of New York Magazine's "Best Doctors" every year since 2002, and is the recipient of the 2009 Willet F. Whitmore Award for Clinical Excellence from Memorial-Sloan Kettering Cancer Center.

== Publications ==
Breitbart has published extensively on psychiatric aspects of cancer, AIDS, and end-of-life care. He has edited/co-edited five textbooks including Psycho-Oncology, Psychiatric Aspects of Symptom Management in the Cancer Patient, Handbook of Psychiatry in Palliative Medicine, and Psychosocial Aspects of Pain: A Handbook for Health Care Providers. Breitbart is editor-in-chief of Cambridge University Press’ international palliative care journal, Palliative & Supportive Care, which focuses on the psychiatric, psychosocial, and spiritual aspects of palliative medicine. Breitbart also helped found the publication arm of the International Psycho-Oncology Society, the IPOS Press. Breitbart had published over 160 peer reviewed publications and 200 chapters and review papers. He serves on the Editorial/Review Boards for various international peer reviewed journals and books, including:

- Journal of Pain and Symptom Management
- Journal of Palliative Medicine
- Cancer
- Journal of Palliative Care
- General Hospital Psychiatry
- Archives of Internal Medicine
- Journal of the American Medical Association
- Supportive Care in Cancer
- The Journal of Supportive Oncology
- Gionale Italiano di Pscico-Oncologia
- Network News
- Current Pain and Headache Reports
- Psychosomatic Medicine
- Psychosomatics
- The Medical Journal of Australia

== Personal life ==
Breitbart was a child of Holocaust survivors, "Moishe" and Rose.

Breitbart currently resides on the Upper East Side of Manhattan with his wife, Rachel, and son, Samuel.

== Bibliography ==
=== Journal editorships ===
1. Breitbart W, Chochinov H, guest editors. Journal of Psychosomatic Research Special Issue Psycho-oncology Research: 45:3, 1998.

2. Palliative and Supportive Care, William Breitbart, M.D., Editor-in-Chief, Cambridge University Press, 2003 to Present. This is the first international palliative care journal (quarterly) that focuses on psychiatric, psycho-social, existential aspects of palliative medicine.

=== Books ===
1. Psychiatric Aspects of Symptom Management in Cancer Patients. Edited by Breitbart W, Holland JC, American Psychiatric Press, Washington DC, 1993.

2. Jacox A, Carr DB, Payne R, Berde C, Breitbart W, Cain JM, Chapman CR, Cleeland CS, Ferrell BR, Finley RS, Hester NO, Stratton Hill Jr. C. Leak DW. Lipman AG, Logan CL, McGarvey CL, Miaskowski CA, Mulder CS, Paice JA, Shapiro BS, Silberstein EB, Smith RS, Stover J, Park S, Tsou CV, Veccheriarelli L, Weissman DE. Management of Cancer Pain: Clinical Practice guideline No. 9. AHCPR Pub. No. 94-0592. Rockville, MD: Agency for Health Care Policy and Research, U.S. Department of Health and Human Resources, Public Health Service, March, 1994.

3. Holland J (ed.), Breitbart W, Jacobsen P, Lederberg M, Loscalzo M, Massie MJ, McCorkle R (co-eds.). Textbook of Psycho-oncology. Oxford University Press, New York, 1998.

4. Handbook of Psychiatry in Palliative Medicine. Chochinov H and Breitbart W (eds.). Oxford University Press. New York, 2000.

5. Psychosocial Aspects of Pain: A Handbook for Health Care Providers. Progress in Pain Research and Management, Volume 27. Dworkin R and Breitbart W (eds.). IASP Press, Seattle, 2003.

6. Handbook of Psychiatry in Palliative Medicine 2nd Edition. Chochinov H and Breitbart W (eds.). Oxford University Press. New York, 2009.

7. Psycho-oncology 2nd Edition. Holland J, Breitbart W, Jacobsen P, Lederberg M, Loscalzo M, McCorkle R (eds.). Oxford University Press, New York, 2010.

=== Journals (editorships) ===
- Palliative and Supportive Care, William Breitbart, M.D., Editor-in-Chief, Cambridge University Press, Launch Date 3/2003. This is the first international palliative care journal (quarterly) that focuses on psychiatric, psycho-social, and existential aspects of palliative medicine.
