= Jeffrey Drebin =

American physician

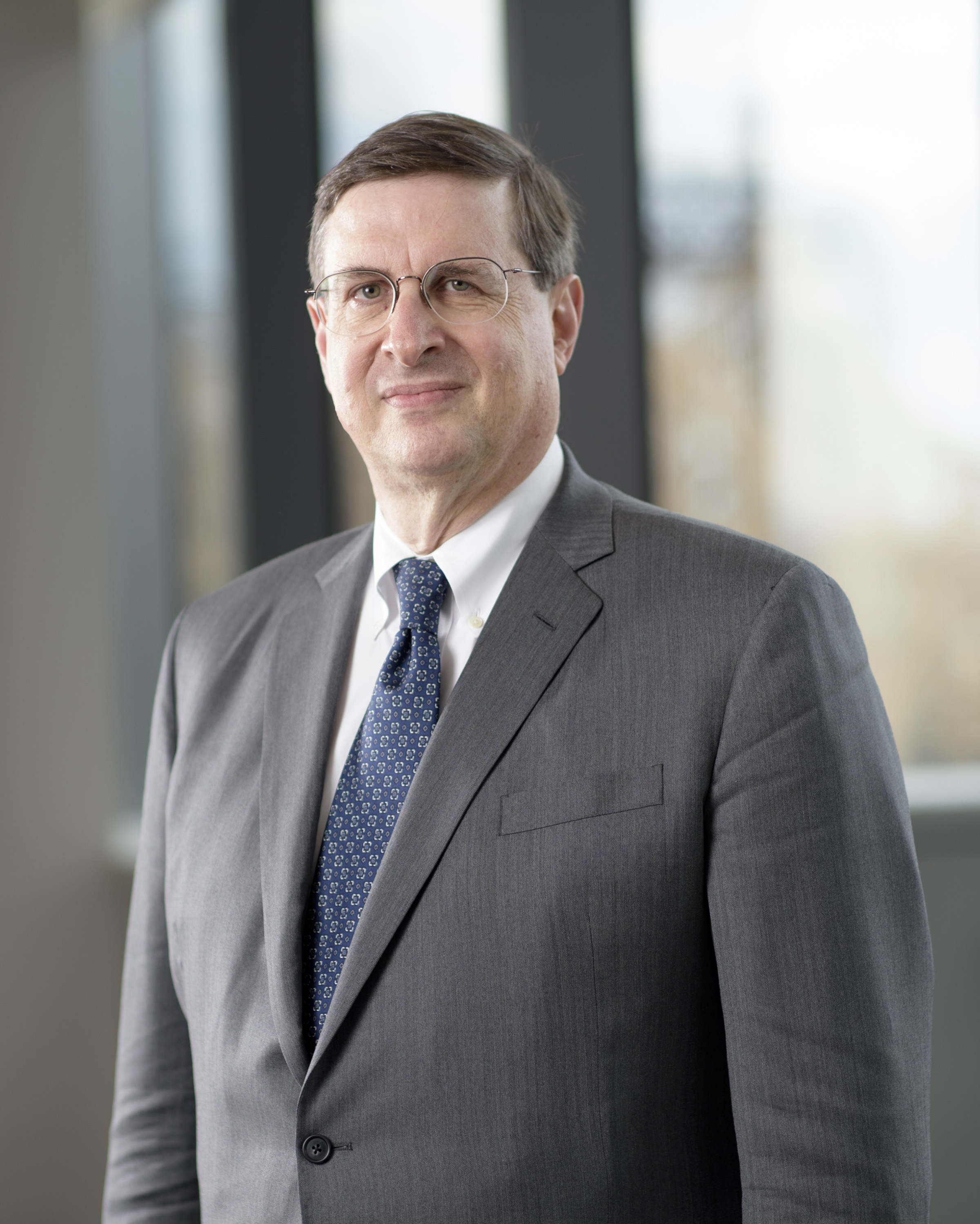
- Education: Harvard Medical School (MD, PhD) * Johns Hopkins Medical School (Residency, Fellowship)
- Known for: Research on Her2/neu protein; development of Herceptin and Perjeta
- Awards: American Association for Cancer Research Surgeon Scientist Award (2016) * Member, National Academy of Medicine (2013) * John Rhea Barton Professorship (2009–2017)
- Scientific career
- Fields: Surgery, Oncology, Cancer research
- Workplaces: Memorial Sloan Kettering Cancer Center (2017–present) * Penn Medicine (2004–2017) * Washington University School of Medicine (1995–2004)
- Doctoral advisor: Mark Greene * Robert Weinberg

Jeffrey Drebin is a surgeon and scientist. He serves as the Chief Physician Executive at Memorial Sloan Kettering.

== Biography ==
Drebin earned his MD and Ph.D. from Harvard Medical School, before completing his general surgery residency, and surgical oncology fellowship, at Johns Hopkins Medical School. His Ph.D. research, performed with Mark Greene and Robert Weinberg, involved the creation of monoclonal antibodies targeting the Her2/neu protein and demonstrating in preclinical models that such antibodies could inhibit cancer cell growth in vitro and in vivo. This work was focused on targeted cancer therapy and the creation of the drugs trastuzumab (Herceptin) and pertuzumab (Perjeta).

== Career ==
In 1995, after finishing his residency, Drebin became an assistant professor of surgery at Washington University School of Medicine. He became an associate professor in 1999, and then a full Professor of Surgery and of Molecular Biology & Pharmacology in 2002. Drebin began working at Penn Medicine in 2004 when he was hired as Chief of the Division of Gastrointestinal Surgery. In 2009, he was named chair of the department. While there, he joined a Stand Up to Cancer “Dream Team” against pancreatic cancer as a co-Principal Investigator alongside Craig B. Thompson. In 2017, Drebin moved to Memorial Sloan Kettering to become Department of Surgery Chair. In 2025, Drebin was named the Chief Physician Executive at Memorial Sloan Kettering. In addition to his responsibilities as Department Chair and Chief Physician Executive, he provides surgical treatments for patients with pancreatic, gallbladder, bile duct, liver, and stomach cancers. His research focuses on the development of new targeted therapies.

== Other roles ==
- President, Society of Clinical Surgery (2010–2012)
- President, Philadelphia Academy of Surgery (2014)
- President, Society of Surgical Oncology (2015)
- President, American Surgical Association (2026)

== Awards ==
- American Association for Cancer Research Surgeon Scientist Award (2016)
- Member, Institute of Medicine of the National Academy of Sciences (now the National Academy of Medicine) (2013)
- John Rhea Barton Professorship (2009–2017)
