= A. Thomas Look =

Pediatric oncologist and researcher

A. Thomas Look is Professor of Pediatrics at Harvard Medical School and Vice-Chair for Research, Pediatric Oncology, Dana–Farber Cancer Institute. He is a pioneer in the use of zebrafish in cancer research and made major contributions to the understanding of leukemia and neuroblastoma biology and pathogenesis.

== Education ==
Look received a BSE in Chemical Engineering from University of Michigan, Ann Arbor, in 1971, followed by a degree in medicine (MD) from the same university in 1975. He undertook most of his training in pediatric oncology at St. Jude Children's Research Hospital, Memphis, before becoming Professor of Pediatrics at University of Tennessee, College of Medicine in 1987. In 1999 he moved to Dana–Farber Cancer Institute to become Vice Chair for Research in Pediatric Oncology and Professor of Pediatric Oncology at Harvard Medical School.

== Honors ==
- 2004 ASCO Pediatric Oncology Lectureship Award, 40th Annual ASCO Mtg, New Orleans, LA.
- 2005 ASPHO Frank A. Oski Memorial Lectureship Award, May 15, 2005 Annual Mtg., Washington, DC.

== Research ==
=== Major discoveries ===
- Discovery of highly recurrent activating Notch mutations in T-ALL (with Jon C. Aster)
- Discovery of somatic enhancer mutations activating TAL1
- The first zebrafish model of cancer - MYC-induced T-ALL in the zebrafish
- Use of gene expression profiling to define distinct oncogenic subgroups in T-ALL
- Discovery of CHK1 suppressed caspase-2 apoptotic pathway in response to DNA damage
- Discovery of activating ALK mutations in neuroblastoma
- Development of FISH to detect MYCN amplification in neuroblastoma
- Discovery of MET-HGF autocrine axis in AML
- Core transcriptional circuitry of TAL1 complex
- Phenothiazines induce PP2A-mediated apoptosis in T cell acute lymphoblastic leukemia
- Cloning and functional characterization of E2A-HLF in B-ALL
- Discovery of the Slug survival pathway in hematopoietic stem cells
- Discovery of MYB duplications in T-ALL
- Discovery of FBXW7 mutations in T-ALL
- Discovery of MYBL2 as the crucial 20q tumor suppressor in MDS
