= William Berryman =

English artist

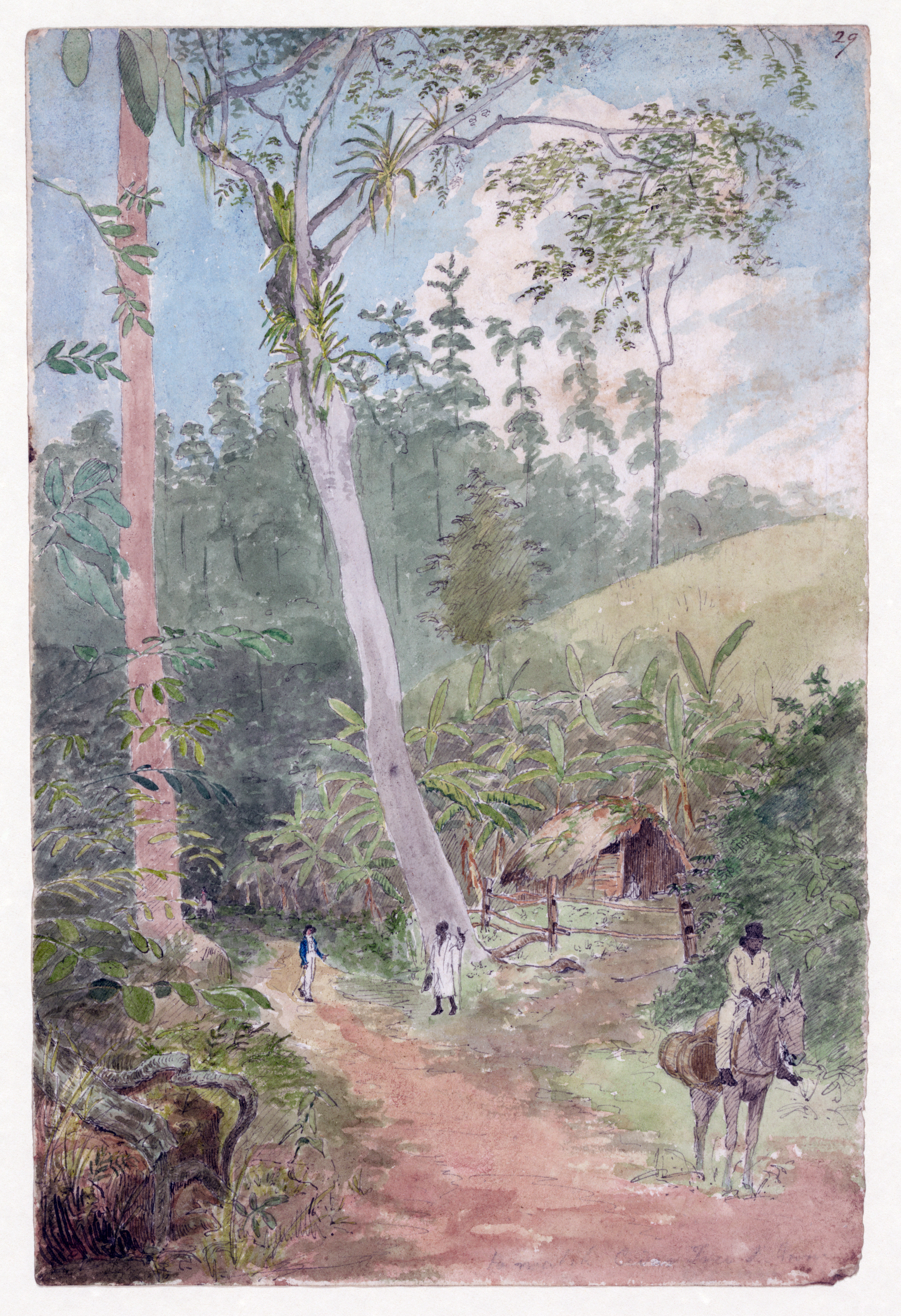
Plantain Walk by William Berryman, watercolour, ink, and pencil

William Berryman was an English artist who was active in Jamaica during the period 1808–1816. He produced over three hundred pencil sketches and watercolours of the Jamaican landscape and the daily lives of the island's people. His work demonstrates particular interest in the lives of the island's majority inhabitants: enslaved people of African and mixed descent. He planned a project of making an engraving series based upon his Jamaican artwork, but died before he could undertake it.

Berryman's life is not well documented. In the early 1800s he lived with his brother John on Great Portland Street, London, and both of them exhibited art in the 1802 exhibition of the Royal Academy of Arts. William and John later contributed woodblock illustrations to John Thomas Smith's Antiquities of Westminster (1807). It is unknown exactly when Berryman arrived in Jamaica, but there is evidence he sought the patronage of Edward Beeston Long, son of wealthy Jamaican plantation owner Edward Long, and a dated illustration places Berryman in Jamaica by May 1808.

Berryman's unpublished work was neglected until it was rediscovered in an album acquired by the United States Library of Congress. His work was exhibited at the Yale University Center for British Art at New Haven, Connecticut, United States and at the British Empire and Commonwealth Museum in Bristol, England, in 2007 and 2008.
