= Pertuzumab =

Pharmaceutical drug

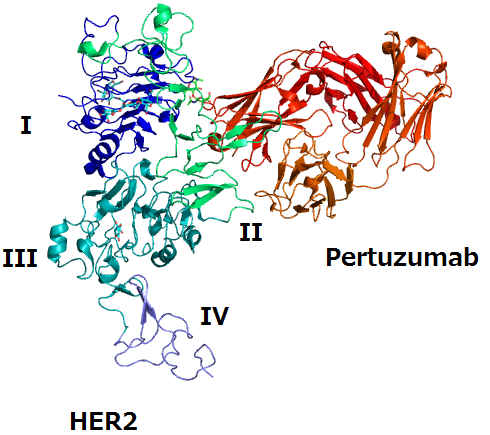
- The structure of HER2 and pertuzumab

Monoclonal antibody
- Type: Whole antibody
- Source: Humanized (from mouse)
- Target: HER2

Clinical data
- Trade names: Perjeta
- Other names: 2C4
- Biosimilars: pertuzumab-dpzb, pertuzumab-qcay, Pebrilzo, Poherdy
- AHFS/Drugs.com: Monograph
- MedlinePlus: a612027
- License data: US DailyMed: Pertuzumab
- Pregnancy category: AU: D
- Routes of administration: Intravenous
- Drug class: Antineoplastic
- ATC code: L01FD02 (WHO)

Legal status
- Legal status: AU: S4 (Prescription only); UK: POM (Prescription only); US: ℞-only; EU: Rx-only

Identifiers
- CAS Number: 380610-27-5
- DrugBank: DB06366
- ChemSpider: none
- UNII: K16AIQ8CTM
- KEGG: D05446
- ChEMBL: ChEMBL2007641

Pertuzumab, sold under the brand name Perjeta among others, is a monoclonal antibody used in combination with trastuzumab and docetaxel for the treatment of metastatic HER2-positive breast cancer; it also used with trastuzumab and chemotherapy as a neoadjuvant in early HER2-positive breast cancer. It is a HER2/neu receptor antagonist.

Side effects in more than half the people taking it include diarrhea, hair loss, and loss of neutrophils; more than 10% experience loss of red blood cells, hypersensitivity or allergic reaction, infusion reactions, decreased appetite, insomnia, distortions in the sense of taste, inflammation of the mouth or lips, constipation, rashes, nail disease, and muscle pain. Women who are pregnant or planning on getting pregnant should not take it, it was not studied in people with certain heart conditions and should be used in caution in such people, and it should not be used with an anthracycline. It is unknown if pertuzumab interacts with doxorubicin.

It is the first-in-class of a kind of medication called a "epidermal growth factor receptor (HER) dimerization inhibitor" — it inhibits the dimerization of HER2 with other HER receptors, which prevents them from signalling in ways that promote cell growth and proliferation.

It was discovered and developed by Genentech and was first approved in 2012.

== Medical uses ==
Pertuzumab is indicated in combination with trastuzumab and docetaxel for treatment of adults with HER2-positive metastatic breast cancer (MBC) who have not received prior anti-HER2 therapy or chemotherapy for metastatic disease.

It is also indicated in combination with trastuzumab and chemotherapy as neoadjuvant treatment of adults with HER2-positive, locally advanced, inflammatory, or early stage breast cancer (either greater than 2 cm in diameter or node positive) as part of a complete treatment regimen for early breast cancer; or adjuvant treatment of adults with HER2-positive early breast cancer at high risk of recurrence.

== Adverse effects ==
In clinical trials of the three-agent combination therapy in metastatic breast cancer, adverse effects occurring in more than half the people taking it included diarrhea, hair loss, and loss of neutrophils; more than 10% of people experienced loss of neutrophils with fever, and loss of leukocytes. After docetaxel was dropped in some people, the most common adverse effects were diarrhea (28.1%), upper respiratory tract infection (18.3%), rash (18.3%), headache (17.0%), fatigue (13.4%), swelling of nasal passages and throat (often due to catching the common cold) (17.0%), weakness (13.4%), itchiness (13.7%), joint pain (11.4%), nausea (12.7%), pain in an extremity (13.4%), back pain (12.1%) and cough (12.1%).

In clinical trials of the neoadjuvant use of the combination, more than 50% of people had hair loss and loss of neutrophils.

In both uses, more than 10% of people additionally experienced: loss of red blood cells, hypersensitivity or allergic reaction, infusion reactions, decreased appetite, insomnia, distortions in the sense of taste, inflammation of the mouth or lips, constipation, rashes, nail disease, and muscle pain.

== Pharmacology ==
The metabolism of pertuzumab has not been directly studied; in general antibodies are cleared principally by catabolism. The median clearance of pertuzumab was 0.235 liters/day and the median half-life was 18 days.

== Mechanism of action ==
HER2 is an extracellular receptor—a receptor tyrosine kinase - that when activated, sets off signal transduction through several pathways that stimulate cell proliferation and cell growth; if overexpressed it can cause uncontrollable growth. HER2 positive breast cancer is caused by ERBB2 gene amplification that results in overexpression of HER2 in approximately 15-30% of breast cancer tumors.

HER2 normally combines another protein in order to function (a process called dimerization); it can bind with a second HER2 receptor (acting as a homodimer) and it can heterodimerize with a different receptor of the HER family. The most potent dimer for activating signalling pathways is HER2/HER3.

The epitope for pertuzumab is the domain of HER2 where it binds to HER3, and pertuzumab prevents the HER2/HER3 dimer from forming, which blocks signalling by the dimer. Trastuzumab is another monoclonal antibody against HER2; its epitope is the domain where HER2 binds to another HER2 protein. The two mAbs together prevent HER2 from functioning.

== Chemistry and manufacturing ==
Pertuzumab is an immunoglobulin G1 with a variable region against the human HER2 protein, a human-mouse monoclonal 2C4 heavy chain, disulfide bound with a human-mouse monoclonal 2C4 κ-chain.

It is manufactured recombinantly in CHO cells.

== History ==
The monoclonal antibody 2C4 appears to have first been published in 1990 by scientists from Genentech, the same year that F. Hoffmann-La Roche AG acquired a majority stake in Genentech.

By 2003, Genentech understood that 2C4 prevented HER2 dimerizing with other HER receptors and had begun Phase I trials, aiming for a broad range of cancers, not just ones overexpressing HER2. It was the first known HER dimerization inhibitor.

In 2005, Genentech presented poor results of Phase II trials of pertuzumab as a single agent in prostate, breast, and ovarian cancers, and said that it intended to continue developing it in combination with other drugs for ovarian cancer.

In 2007, Genentech dropped the brand name Omnitarg.

In March 2009, Roche acquired Genentech.

Pertuzumab was approved for medical use in the European Union in 2013.

== Society and culture ==
=== Legal status ===
==== Biosimilars ====
In November 2025, the biosimilar pertuzumab-dpzb (Poherdy) was approved for medical use in the United States as an interchangeable biosimilar to Perjeta. It is the first approval of a biosimilar for Perjeta.

In September 2026, the Committee for Medicinal Products for Human Use of the European Medicines Agency adopted a positive opinion, recommending the granting of a marketing authorization for the medicinal product Pebrilzo, intended for the treatment of breast cancer. The applicant for this medicinal product is Biocon Biologics Ireland. Pebrilzo is a biosimilar medicinal product that is highly similar to the reference product Perjeta, which was authorized in the EU in March 2013. Pebrilzo was approved for medical use in the European Union in November 2026.

=== Economics ===
As of 2016, in the US each cycle of the three-drug combination given every three weeks costs around US$8,500, not including ancillary care costs.

In the UK, a NICE evaluation in 2015, made a preliminary finding that the drug combination was not cost effective, and NICE rejected the drug in the neoadjuvant setting in May 2016, primarily because it was unknown if the drug combination provided a survival benefit. This decision was subsequently reversed six months later and pertuzumab became the first new breast cancer drug to be approved by NICE for routine NHS funding in almost a decade after Roche pledged to provide the drug to the NHS at an undisclosed discount for patients in the neoadjuvant setting and to share the long–term financial risks.
