= Patricia Hogan =

Professor Emerita at Northern Michigan University

Canadian-American Patricia Hogan is a Professor Emerita (Management of Health & Fitness in the School of Health and Human Performance) at Northern Michigan University in Marquette, Michigan, USA. Dr. Hogan publishes and presents in the areas of developing Professional Intellect in university students, Inquiry-Based and Problem-Based Learning, student agency, professional ethics, prosumerism, Social Media applications in education mission-central learning, and in Social Media for Sport and Fitness Business. Her educational scholarly interests involve experimenting with promoting a connectivist approach (Siemens, 2009) to enhance learning for relevant literacies and skill-sets in her classes and to teaching for integrative and abductive reasoning and design thinking (Martin on YouTube, 2009). She also engages Project Based Learning in her classes. In the 2014-15 academic year she was on sabbatical working with SBRnet data and her colleague, James Santomier, to publish and present on the use of social media and mobile media in sport/fitness.

== Awards ==
Hogan follows a constructivist educational philosophy and has won awards for her educational use of wikis (e.g., https://wiki.acs.nmu.edu/hl368/index.php/Main_Page and https://web.archive.org/web/20110720020530/https://wiki.acs.nmu.edu/hl440/index.php/Main_Page) to develop education mission-central outcomes (such as self-directed learning, collaboration, critical and creative thinking, communication skills, and professional intellect and career knowledge and skills) in health/fitness business management students. She is involved in and has awards for co-creating classes and course texts with her students using the Wix for course construction (for an example see http://phoga7.wix.com/cohl322createdtextf11#!), student work (for an example see http://phoga7.wix.com/cohl322createdtextf11#!page-3), and outcomes assessment (see http://phoga7.wix.com/pattioutcomeswix). She has also won NMU's Excellence in Teaching Award and excellence in advising awards. Here she speaks on the importance of university mission-central education. Also, she has been awarded four Innovation in Teaching Awards from NMU (http://www.nmu.edu/academicaffairs/node/38) as well as the 2013 Outstanding Michigan College/University Teacher of the Year Award from the Michigan Association of Health, Physical Education, Recreation and Dance.

== Peer-reviewed published work ==
- Patricia I. Hogan, Ph.D.; James Santomier Jr., Ph.D.; Brian Myers, M.Ed. (2016-2017)Sport Education in the VUCA World. Journal of Physical Education and Sports Management, 3(1), pp. 1–37 DOI: 10.15640/jpesm.v3n1a1 URL: https://jpesm.com/. Peer Reviewed Accepted Publication in e- and paper form. At https://jpesm.com/ until January 1, 2018.
- Santomier, J., Hogan, P and Reinhard Kunz. (2016 upcoming). The 2012 London Olympics: Innovations in ICT and Social Media Marketing. Special Section on Sport Innovation for Innovation: Management, Policy & Practice Journal. Peer Reviewed accepted paper to journal based on EURAM paper and presentation..
- Santomier, J., Hogan, P., and Reinhard Kunz (2016) The 2012 London Olympics: Innovations in ICT and Social Media Marketing. European Association of Management (EURAM) Conference- Sport Management Branch, June 1–4, Paris France.
- Santomier, J., Henkel, T. and Hogan, P. (June 2015). Managing Sport: Social Media Marketing by Bundesliga Teams. Peer reviewed paper acceptance presentation; Paper published online. European Association of Management (EURAM), Warsaw, Poland, June 18–20, 2015. http://2015.euramfullpaper.org/program/papers.asp
- Hogan, P., Carlson, B., and Kirk, C. (April 2015). Showcasing: Open Educational Practices’ Models using Open Educational Resources. Peer reviewed paper acceptance presentation Open Education Global Conference, Banff, Canada, April 22–24, 2015. Paper and presentation published online at https://conference.oeconsortium.org/2015/presentation/showcasing-open-educational-practices-models-using-open-educational-resources/ Peer Reviewed Accepted Paper and Presentation: Published online. And http://commons.nmu.edu/cgi/viewcontent.cgi?article=1064&context=facwork_conferencepapers
- Santomier, J. and Hogan, P. (September 2015) Sport Management Education for the Digital Age. European Association of Sport Management (EASM) Conference, September 9–12, Dublin, Ireland.
- Hogan, P. and Santomier, J. (September 2015). The 2012 Olympics: A New Digital Template for Sport Events. European Association of Sport Management (EASM) Conference, September 9–12, Dublin, Ireland. Peer Review Acceptance.
- Santomier, J., Henkel, T. and Hogan, P. (June 2015). Managing Sport: Social Media Marketing by Bundesliga Teams. Peer reviewed paper acceptance presentation; Paper published online. European Association of Management (EURAM), Warsaw, Poland, June 18–20, 2015. http://2015.euramfullpaper.org/program/papers.asp
- Kirk, C., Hogan, P. and Carlson, B. (May 2015). Digigogy: Toward a Pedagogy of Connections. Great Lakes Conference on Teaching and Learning. Central Michigan University, May 13–15, Mount Pleasant, MI, USA. https://docs.google.com/presentation/d/1WY-f4is_V97cdKpdH486VY_qKk6fNw_xhql0I6ti8A8/edit#slide=id.g9eeb4082a_2_127
- Peer Reviewed Accepted Paper and Presentation: Hogan, P., Carlson, B., and Kirk, C. (April 2015). Showcasing: Open Educational Practices’ Models using Open Educational Resources. Peer reviewed paper acceptance presentation Open Education Global Conference, Banff, Canada, April 22–24, 2015. Paper and presentation published online at https://conference.oeconsortium.org/2015/presentation/showcasing-open-educational-practices-models-using-open-educational-resources/ .
- Peer Reviewed Acceptance. Hogan, P., Santomier, J. and Schuart, J. (February 2015). Increasing Sport Management Student Engagement through Technology: Toward Digigogy. Commission on Sport Management Accreditation (COSMA) Conference, February 12–13, 2015, Philadelphia, PA, USA. https://web.archive.org/web/20150118083054/http://www.cosmaweb.org/schedule-and-events.html
- Peer Reviewed Acceptance. Santomier, J., Hogan, P., and Kunz, Reinhard. (September 2014). Sport Viewing and Social Media Usage: A U.S. Market Perspective. European Association of Sport Management (EASM) Conference, September 9–12, 2014, Coventry, England. https://www.easm.net/download/2014/217-Accept-oral-presentation-Santomier-SPORT-VIEWING-AND-SOCIAL-MEDIA-USAGE-A-US-MARKE.pdf
- Peer Reviewed Accepted Conference Paper based on research conducted by SBRnet (http://www.sbrnet.com/) : Santomier, J., Hogan, P., and Lipsey, R. (June 2014) Managing Sport: U.S. Sport Consumers Use of Media 2011-2013, European Association of Management (EURAM) Conference: Sport Business Track, Valencia, Spain, June 4–7, 2014. http://2014.euramfullpaper.org/program/login.asp
- Peer Reviewed Accepted. Santomier, J., Hogan, P. and Lipsey, R. (March 2014) TV and Online Viewing and Social Media Usage by U.S. Sport Consumers. 7th Summit on Communication and Sport, March 14–16, 2014. New York City, NY, USA. SBRnet Data used.
- Invited (March 2013) book chapter: Hogan, P., Kirk, C., Carlson, B., & Pendleton, G. Published December 13, 2013. Chapter Title: Prosumerism: Students as Co-creators of Text and Content. Text Title: The Online University: Building Viable Learning Experiences for Higher Education. Editor: Dr. Richard M. Kesner, D’Amore and McKim School of Business, Northeastern University. Publisher: World Universities Forum.
- Invited book chapter with peer review: Hogan, P. and Santomier, J.P. (Editors: Harald Dolles and Sten Söderman, Handbook of Research on Sport and Business, Publishers: Edward Elgar Publishing, Ltd. 2013. Chapter: Social Media & Prosumerism: Implications for Sport Marketing Research.
- Santomier, J.P, Hogan, P.I., & Kunz, R. (September 2011) Social Media Integration During the 2010 World Cup. European Association for Sport Management (EASM) Conference, Madrid, Spain, September 7–11. Peer Reviewed.
- Pendleton, G., Hogan, P., & Poindexter, S. (2011) International student e-learning in asynchronous time: Wiki collaborative technology across countries. The Global Journal of Finance and Economics, Volume 8, No. 1. Peer Selected based on AIB Southwest Conference papers.
- Hogan, P.I., Santomier, J.P. & Pendleton, G. (June 2011) Toward a Learning-culture in Sport Business Education. Paper published proceedings. 11th European Association of Management (EURAM) Conference held in Tallinn, Estonia June 1–4, 2011. Peer Reviewed.
- Pendleton, G., Hogan, P. & Poindexter, S. (March 2011) International Student e-learning in asynchronous time: Wiki collaborative technology across countries. 2011 Annual Conference of the Academy of International Business – Southwest Chapter. Houston, Texas, USA, March 9–12, 2011 Published Proceedings of the 2010 Annual Conference of the Academy of International Business (AIB) -SW Chapter
- Santomier, J.P. & Hogan, P.I. (October 2010) "Prosumer Economy & Prosumer Marketing –Lessons in Educating for Global Education in Turbulent Times. Paper Published Proceedings of the 2010 Annual Conference of the Academy of International Business (AIB) -NE Chapter. Double Blind Peer Review. Quinnipiac University Business School, Hamden, CT, USA, September 30-October 2, 2010
- Peer Reviewer for Submitted Papers, European Association of Management
- Invited book chapter with peer review: Hogan, P. & Santomier, J.P. (coming Summer 2011) Social Media & Prosumerism: Implications for Sport Marketing Research. Editors: Harald Dolles and Sten Söderman, Handbook of Research on Sport and Business, Publishers: Edward Elgar Publishing, Ltd.
- Santomier, J.P. & Hogan, P.I. (coming October 2010). Prosumer Economy & Prosumer Marketing –Lessons in Educating for Global Education in Turbulent Times. Published Proceedings of the 2010 Annual Conference of the Academy of International Business (AIB) -NE Chapter. Quinnipiac University Business School, Hamden, CT, USA, September 30-October 2, 2010
- Hogan, P. and Santomier, J.P (May 2010) Back to Future Shock: Social media, prosumerism and sport promotion. Published Proceedings of the European Academy of Management Conference (EURAM) in Rome, Italy (May 19–23, 2010).
- Promoting healthy lifestyles for older adults: Understanding arthritis. (April 2010).Journal of Physical Education, Recreation, & Dance Journal. With Tremethick, M.J. Adams, K., & Coleman, B.
- Teaching for practical liberal education in health education through health literacy. (Winter 2006) Connections, a quarterly peer-reviewed journal at Kean University in New Jersey. With Tremethick, M.J. and Teeters, C. [Now, Journal of School Connections ].
- Santomier, J. P. & Hogan, P. I. (2002) Online Business Education:Issues and Challenges. JOURNAL OF UNIVERSITY OF ELECTRONIC SCIENCE AND TECHNOLOGY OF CHINA(SOCIAL SCIENCES EDITION), Issue 3, Page 26-30. See: http://open.oriprobe.com/articles/4719525/Online_Business_Education_Issues_and_Challenges.htm
- Santomier, J.P. & Hogan, P.I.(1999) Using Problem-based Learning to meet Globalized Education Needs. Korean Journal of Thinking and Problem Solving, 9(2), 31=50.
- Santomier, J.P. & Hogan, P.I. (1994). Health implications of alcohol and other drug use. Journal of Addictions Nursing 6(2), 46-55.
- Hogan, P.I. Problem based learning and personnel preparation in adapted physical education. Adapted Physical Activity Quarterly 7(3), July 1990.
- Hogan, P.I. (1988). Applying the strategic management process in recreation programming. Leisure Information Quarterly, 14(2).
- Demopoulos, H.B., Santomier, J.P., Seligman, M.L., Hogan, P.I., & Pietronigro, D.D. (1986). Free radical pathology: Rationale and toxicology of antioxidants and other supplements in sports medicine and exercise science. In F. Katch (Ed.), Sports, Health and Nutrition. Champaign, IL: Human Kinetics Press.
- Development of self-concept and self-efficacy: Considerations for mainstreaming. With Craft, Diane H. Adapted Physical Activity Quarterly. Vol 2(4), Oct 1985, 320-327.
- Effect of mastering swim skills on older adults' self-efficacy. (1984). Research Quarterly for Exercise and Sport. With J. Santomier.

== Other: selected peer-reviewed or invited presentations ==
- Santomier, J., Hogan, P., and Kunz, Reinhard. (September 2014) Sport Viewing and Social Media Usage: A U.S. Market Perspective. European Association of Sport Management (EASM) Conference September 9–12, 2014, Coventry, England. Peer Reviewed Acceptance.
- Santomier, J., Hogan, P., and Lipsey, R. (June 2014) Managing Sport: U.S. Sport Consumers Use of Media 2011-2013, European Association of Management (EURAM): Sport Business Track, Valencia, Spain, June 4–7, 2014. Peer Reviewed Acceptance.
- Santomier, J., Hogan, P., and Lipsey, R. (March 2014) TV and Online Viewing and Social Media Usage by U.S. Sport Consumers, 2011-2013: NFL Overview. International Association for Communication and Sport (IACS), 7th Summit on Communication and Sport, March 14–16, New York City. Peer Reviewed Acceptance.
- Rademacher, C. & Hogan, P. (January 2013) Creative Learning Designs: Students as Co-creators of Text and Content. World University Forum. Vancouver, BC, Canada. January 8–10, 2013. Peer Reviewed Acceptance.
- Hogan, P.I. & Kirk, C. (July 2012) Wix as a platform for showcasing learner-centered courses and outcomes assessment. 37th International Improving University Teaching Conference, Innsbruck, Austria, July 24–27. Peer Reviewed Acceptance.
- Santomier, J.P. & Hogan, P. I. (June 2012) Social media innovation during the 2010 FIFA world cup: A descriptive case study. European Association of Management Conference, Rotterdam, The Netherlands, June 6–8, 2012. Peer Reviewed Acceptance.
- Santomier, J.P, Hogan, P.I., & Kunz, R. (September 2011) Social Media Integration during the 2010 World Cup. European Association for Sport Management (EASM) Conference, Madrid, Spain, September 7–11. Peer Reviewed Acceptance. https://web.archive.org/web/20130824040410/http://easm2011.com/greetings-chair.php
- Hogan, P.I., Santomier, J.P. & Pendleton, G. (June 2011) Toward a Learning-culture in Sport Business Education. Paper presentation related to the track on "Sport as Business" at the 11th European Association of Management (EURAM) Conference, Tallinn, Estonia June 1–4, 2011. Peer Reviewed Acceptance.
- Pendleton, G., Hogan, P. & Poindexter, S. (March 2011) International Student e-learning in asynchronous time: Wiki collaborative technology across countries. 2011 Annual Conference of the Academy of International Business – Southwest Chapter. Houston, Texas, USA, March 9–12, 2011. Peer Reviewed Acceptance.
- Santomier, J.P. & Hogan, P.I. (October 2010) Prosumer Economy & Prosumer Marketing: Global Education in Turbulent Times. 2010 Annual Conference of the Academy of International Business (AIB) -NorthEast Chapter. Quinnipiac University Business School, Hamden, CT, USA, September 30-October 2, 2010. Double Blind Peer Reviewed and Accepted.
- Hogan, P. (September 2010) Featured on Academic Service Learning Quick Tips Video: Discussion of Using MCC grant to accomplish research on teaching and learning with new technologies: http://webb.nmu.edu/ASL/SiteSections/Resources/Webinars/QuickTips_Overview.shtml
- Hogan, P. (July 2010) Interview on Real Time Case Study with a Wiki for Innovative Instructional Technology: Request by Matt Smock, NMU Head of Instructional Technology https://nmuctip0910.blogspot.com/2010/07/ctip-presentation-at-emerging.html
- Hogan, P.I. (Summer 2010). Featured in EURAM (European Assoc of Management) Newsletter for Innovative Instructional Technology: See pg 3, https://web.archive.org/web/20110726041607/http://euram-online.org/userfiles/file/EURAM%20-%20Summer%202010.pdf
- Hogan, P.I. & Santomier, J.P. (May 2010). Social Media, Prosumerism and Sport Promotion. European Association of Management (EURAM), Rome, Italy. Presentation and Published Proceedings. Peer Reviewed Acceptance.
- Hogan, P. I. & Tremethick, M.J. (March 2010). A Demonstration of Learning Environments for a Web 2.0 World. American Alliance of Health, Physical Education, Recreation, and Dance National Convention, Indianapolis, Indiana. Peer Reviewed Acceptance.
- Burgmeier, M., Hogan, P., Kirk, C, Tremethick, MJ. (September 2009) Undergraduate Students’ Perception of a Problem Based Learning (PBL) Experience, Lilly Conference North 2009, Traverse City, Michigan. September 24–27. Peer Reviewed Acceptance.
- Hogan, P. Kirk, C., Burgmeier, M, Tremethick, MJ (September 2009). Engaging Undergraduates in Ethical Reasoning Using Problem Based Learning (PBL). Poster Presentation, Lilly Conference North, Traverse City, MI. September 24–27. See Kirk discussion at: https://web.archive.org/web/20100714170615/http://www.tltgroup.org/Posters/LillyNorth09.htm Peer Reviewed Acceptance.
- Invited presentation: "Promoting Professionalism in Sport Business". European Academy of Management Conference (EURAM) in Liverpool (May 11–14, 2009), Liverpool, England. May 12, 2009. With Santomier, J. See: http://www.euram2009.org/userfiles/file/EURAM_Sessions.pdf p. 38. Peer Reviewed Acceptance.
- Santomier, J. & Hogan, P. (September 12, 2008). "Toward the Bright Side: A Multidisciplinary Approach to Managing Ethical Issues in Sport", Presentation of the 16th Congress of the European Association for Sport Management, Heidelberg, Germany, September 10–13, 2008. See: http://www.easm2008.de/fileadmin/user_upload/pdf/easm_programme.pdf p. 15. Peer Reviewed Acceptance.
- Tremethick, M.J. & Hogan, P. Use of the HealthCat Wiki. (April 2008). American Alliance of Health, Physical Education, Recreation, and Dance National Convention, Southern Illinois University, Carbondale. See: http://aahperd.confex.com/aahperd/2008/preliminaryprogram/abstract_11939.htm Peer Reviewed Acceptance.
- Invited Presentation: Tremethick, M.J. & Hogan, P.I. (May 2007) Clinical problem solving with Professional Health Literacy Skills. The Institute for Healthcare Advancement's Sixth Annual Health Literacy Conference: Health Literacy and Chronic Illness Management. May 4–5, 2007, Anaheim, CA, USA.
- Hogan, P.I. & Santomier, J.P. (September 2005). "Steroids in sports: Addressing key issues to promote ethics education through sport", Peer reviewed acceptance for presentation of the 13th Congress of the European Association for Sport Management, Newcastle, U.K.
- Tremethick, M.J. & Hogan, P.I. (September 2005). Can You Picture It? Images and Teaching. Lilly North Conference, Traverse City, Michigan. Peer Reviewed Acceptance.
- Hogan, P. & Tremethick, M.J. (September 2004). Collaboratories: Using Problem Based Learning (PBL) To Foster Learning Community. Lilly North Conference, Traverse City, Michigan. See: https://web.archive.org/web/20110713205340/http://lillyconferences.com/tc/download/2004_Lilly_TC_Program.pdf p. 3 Peer Reviewed Acceptance.
- Using Technology in Outcomes Assessment and Student E-portfolios. (April 2004). American Alliance of Health, Physical Education, Recreation, and Dance National Convention. With Tremethick, M.J. and Coleman, B. See: http://aahperd.confex.com/aahperd/2004/finalprogram/session_18792.htm Peer Reviewed Acceptance.
- Hogan, P.I. & Santomier, J.P. (November 2003). "Noetic Partnering with Students", Peer reviewed acceptance for presentation at the 7th Annual Sport Management Association of Australia and New Zealand (SMAANZ) Conference. Dunedin, New Zealand. See: https://web.archive.org/web/20090923180444/http://www.staff.vu.edu.au/anzals/news31.pdf pg 20. .
- Santomier, J.P. & Hogan, P.I. (June 2002). "New Economy, New Society, New Education: A Model for Online Business Education" Asian Forum on Business Education (AFBE), Peer Review Accepted Presentation, Renmin University of China, Beijing, China, June 8–9, 2002. See: http://d.wanfangdata.com.cn/Periodical_dzkjdxxb-shkx200203007.aspx
- Santomier, J.P & Hogan, P.I. (November 1999). "Preparing Professionals for the New Economy: A Model for Enhancing Professional Intellect". Peer Review Presentation for The 1999 Asian Forum on Business Education (AFBE) Conference, Hong Kong.
- Hogan, P.I., Nelson, J. & Larson, S. (July 8, 1998). "Developing Professional Intellect in the 21st Century Student". Peer review accepted workshop presentation. At the 23rd International Conference on Improving University Learning and Teaching, Dublin City University, Dublin, Ireland.
- Hogan, P.I. (June 11, 1997). Invited Presentation: "Workshop on Problem Based Learning". For faculty at Hong Kong Institute of Education, Hong Kong, Hong Kong.
- Hogan, P.I. (June 12, 1997). Invited Presentation: "Making Higher Education Relevant for the 21st Century: The Roles of Critical Thinking and Problem Based Learning". For faculty at Hong Kong Institute of Education, Hong Kong, Hong Kong.
- Hogan, P.I. & Santomier, J.P. (June 6, 1997). "Developing Professional Intellect". Peer review accepted presentation . At 7th International Conference on Thinking in Singapore, Singapore.
- Santomier, J.P. & Hogan, P.I. (June 2, 1997). "Preparing Postsecondary Students in China for a Competitive Global Economy: A Role for Problem Based Learning". Peer review accepted presentation. At 7th International Conference on Thinking in Singapore, Singapore.
- Hogan, P. I., Waters, W., and Hanson, R. "Teaching for Liberal Education and Interdisciplinary Outcomes in the Professional Areas: Problem Based Learning". Conference on Liberal Arts and the Future of University Education, Banff, Alberta, Canada, May 11, 1996.
- Santomier, J.P. and Hogan, P.I. "Quality Assurance in Higher Education". Peer Review Accepted Paper for the International Conference on Quality Assurance and Evaluation in Higher Education, Beijing, China, May 7, 1996.
- Hogan, P.I. Invited to present: "Health Promotion through Critical Thinking". Sixth International Conference on Thinking, Massachusetts Institute of Technology, Cambridge, MA, July 22, 1994.
- Suksi, J. and Hogan, P.I. "Promoting Quality Thinking through Problem Based Learning". Presented at the Sixth International Conference on Thinking, Massachusetts Institute of Technology, Cambridge, MA, July 21, 1994.
