= Lou and Peter Berryman =

American folk singer-songwriters

Lou (left) and Peter (right) Berryman, publicity photograph.

Lou and Peter Berryman (born 1947) are American folk singer-songwriters and longtime residents of Madison, Wisconsin.

Lou (short for Louise) and Peter were married at one time—hence the common last name. They divorced but remained friends and musical partners (subsequently, they married again to new spouses.) Mostly, guitarist Peter writes the lyrics and accordionist Lou writes the music, but all their songs are collaborations.

They specialize in songs that make humorous observations about the human condition. For example, "A Chat With Your Mother" is about a parent horrified by her child's cursing, and "Orange Cocoa Cake" presents another mother attempting, on the phone, to tell a friend a recipe while her children demand her attention.

The Berrymans release their work on their own label, Cornbelt.

In 2004, a musical revue Love is the Weirdest of All: The Music of Lou and Peter Berryman premiered at the Madison Repertory Theatre.

Valdy's single "A Chorus For Peter and Lou" was written about them by Craig Wood when the two had a sojourn in Canada during the Vietnam War.

The duo announced in 2017 that they would no longer tour nationally.

== Discography ==
- No Relation (1980)
- Cupid's Trash Truck (1981)
- So Comfortable (1984)
- February March (1986)
- Your State's Name Here (1988)
- Forward Hey (1988)
- Cow Imagination (1990)
- We Don't Talk About That! (1992)
- What, Again?! (1993)
- Double Yodel (1995)
- Some Kinda Funny (1998)
- House Concert (2000)
- Yah Hey (2002)
- The PINK One (2003)
- Love is the Weirdest of All: The Music of Lou and Peter Berryman (2004)
- Some Days (2005)
- The Universe: 14 Examples (2007)
- Rocky Frontier (2011)
- I Don't Get It (2014)
- OK, So Far... (2019)

== Songbooks ==
- The Berryman Berryman Songbook (1984)
- The New Berryman Berryman Songbook (1989)
- Frescoes and Bowling Balls (1996)
- Lou and Peter's Big Songbook (2016)
