= Memorial Sloan Kettering Cancer Center =

Treatment and research hospital in New York City

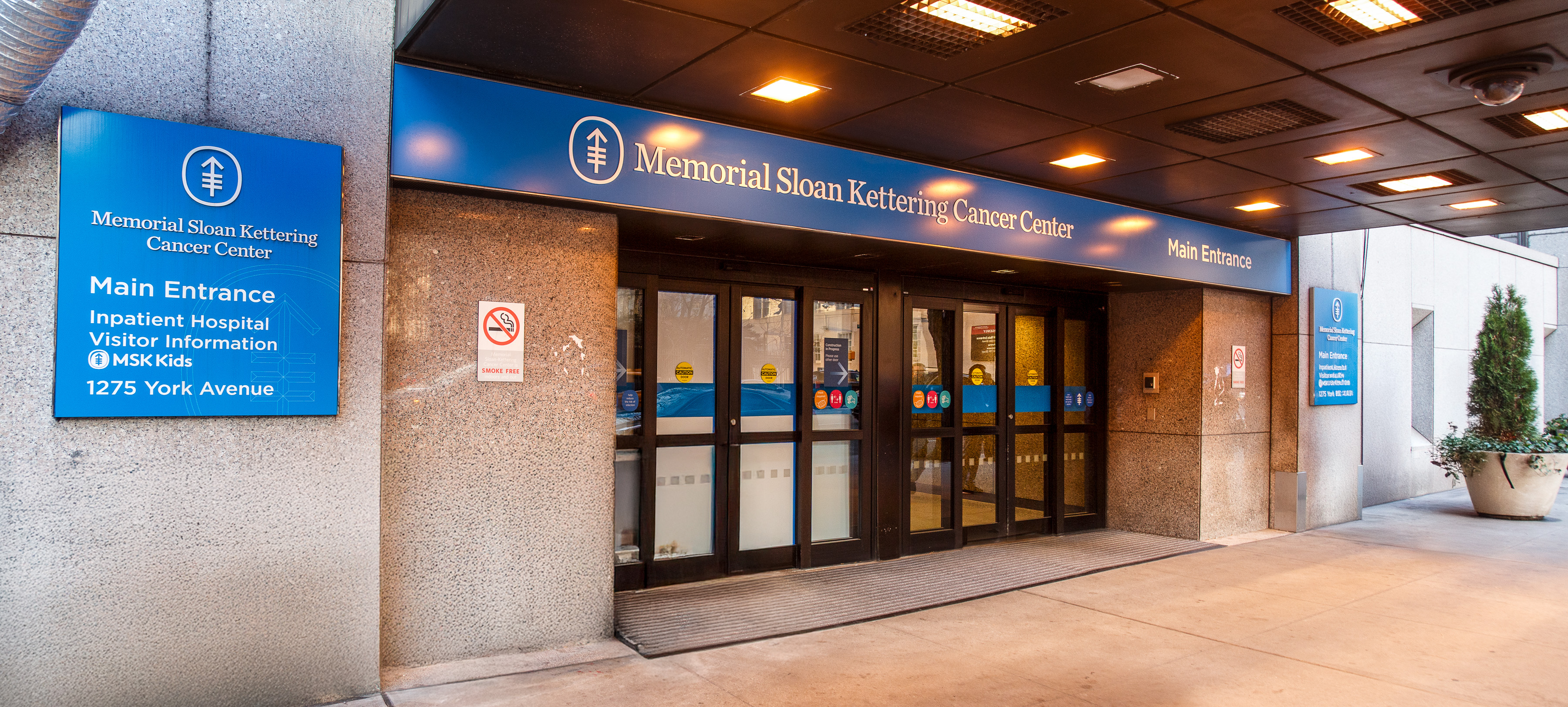
- Main entrance on York Avenue

Geography
- Location: 1275 York Avenue, Manhattan, New York City, U.S.
- Coordinates: 40.764096°N 73.956842°W

Organisation
- Type: Specialist

Services
- Emergency department: Urgent care center
- Beds: 514
- Speciality: Oncology

History
- Former name: New York Cancer Hospital
- Opened: 1884; 142 years ago (as New York Cancer Hospital)

Links
- Website: www.mskcc.org
- Lists: Hospitals in U.S.
- Other links: Hospitals in Manhattan

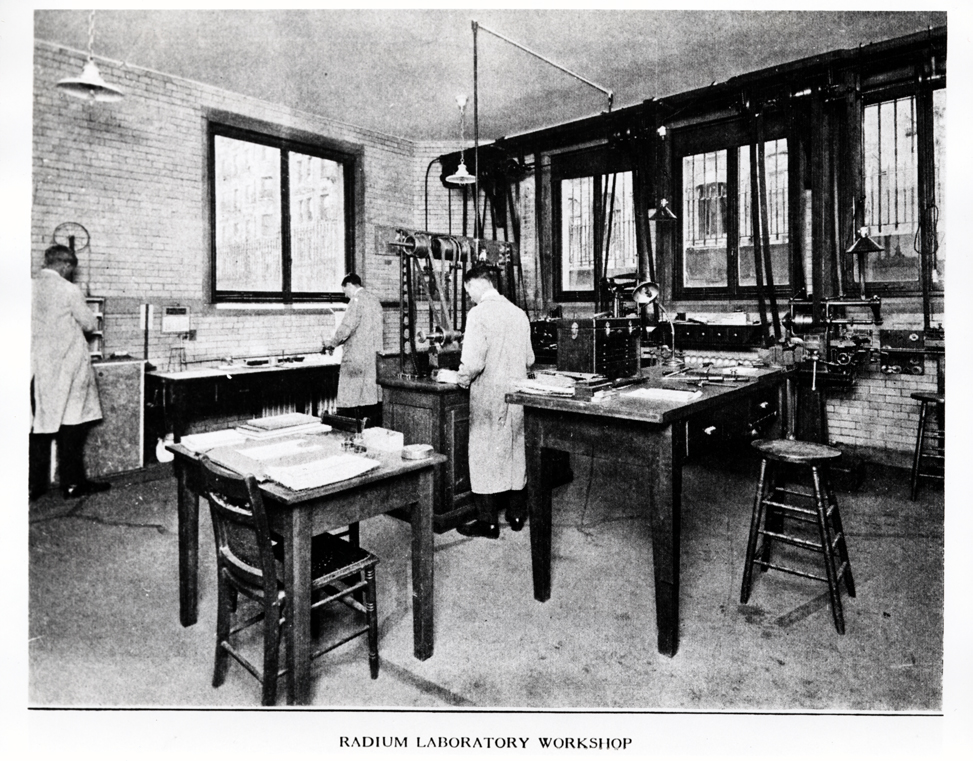
A radium laboratory at Memorial Hospital, 1918

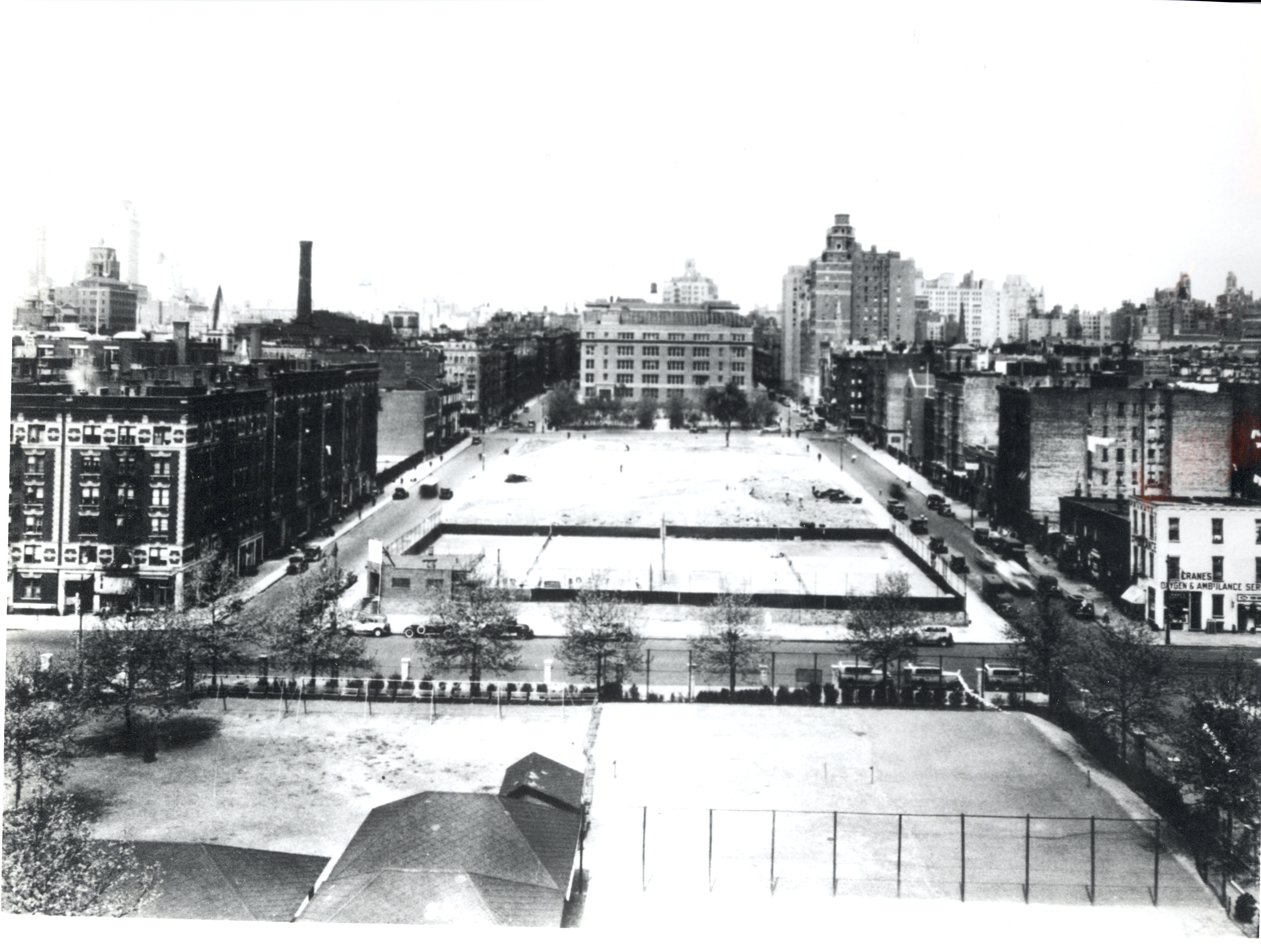
Rockefeller's York Avenue land donation, 1937

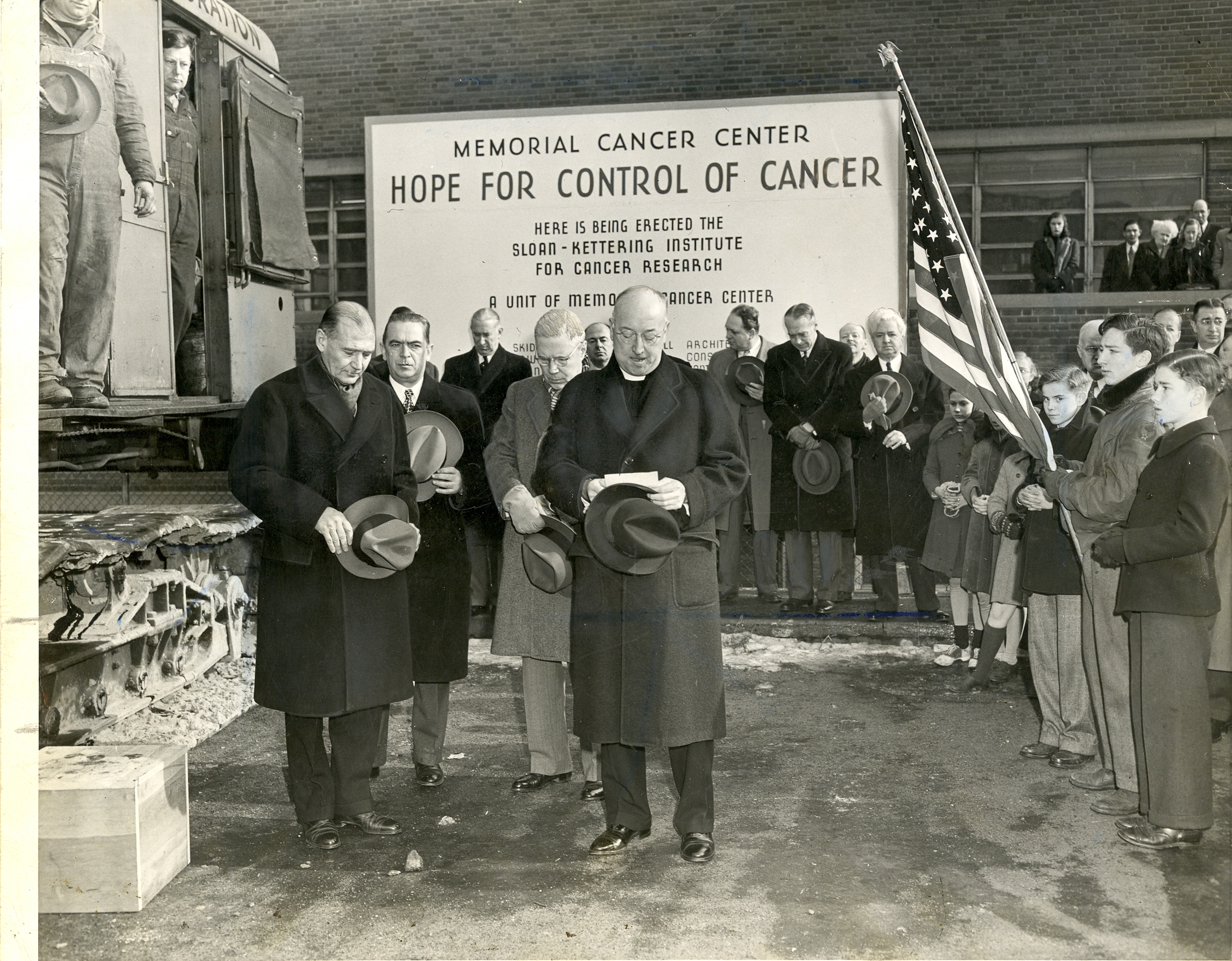
Groundbreaking at the Sloan Kettering Institute, 1946

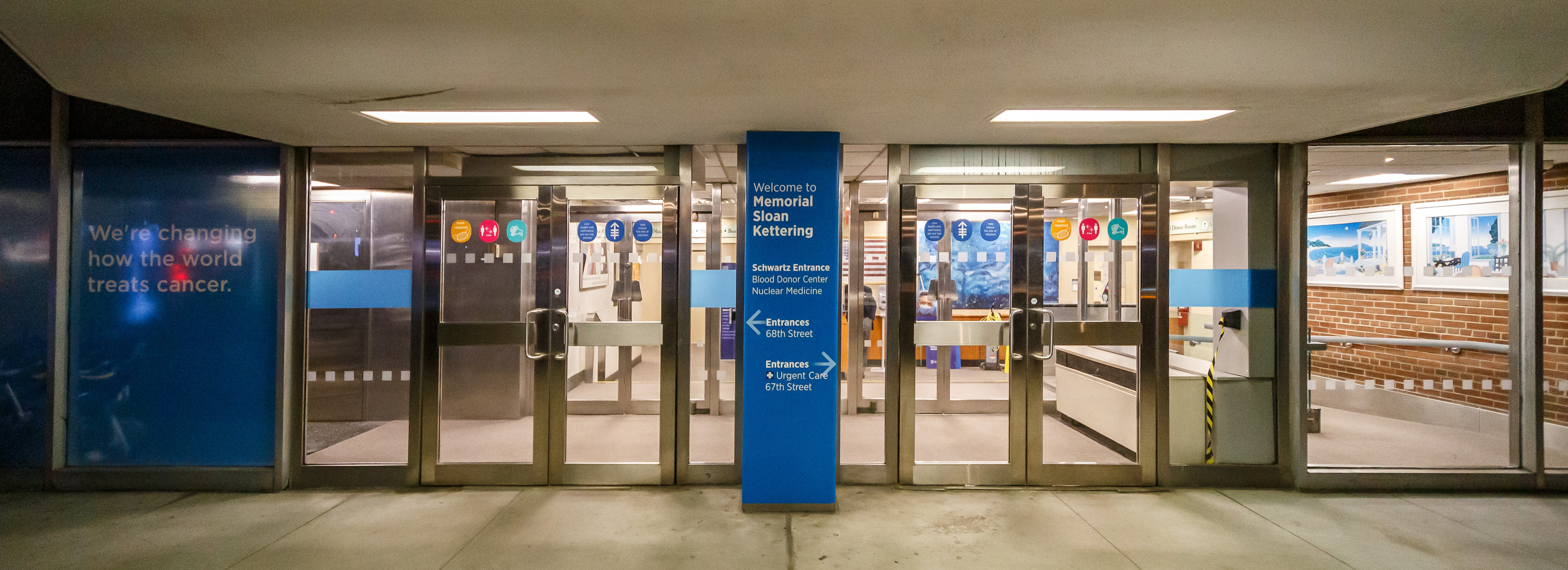
The Schwartz Cancer Research Building, at 1250 1st Avenue

Memorial Sloan Kettering Cancer Center (MSK or MSKCC) is a cancer treatment and research institution in Manhattan in New York City. MSKCC is one of 72 National Cancer Institute–designated Comprehensive Cancer Centers. Its main campus is located at 1275 York Avenue between 67th and 68th Streets in Manhattan.

It was formed in 1980 from the merger of the Memorial Hospital for the Treatment of Cancer and Allied Diseases, founded in 1884, and the adjacent Sloan-Kettering Institute for Cancer Research, founded in 1945. The two medical entities had formally coordinated their operations since 1960.

== History ==
=== Early history of Memorial Hospital (1884–1934) ===
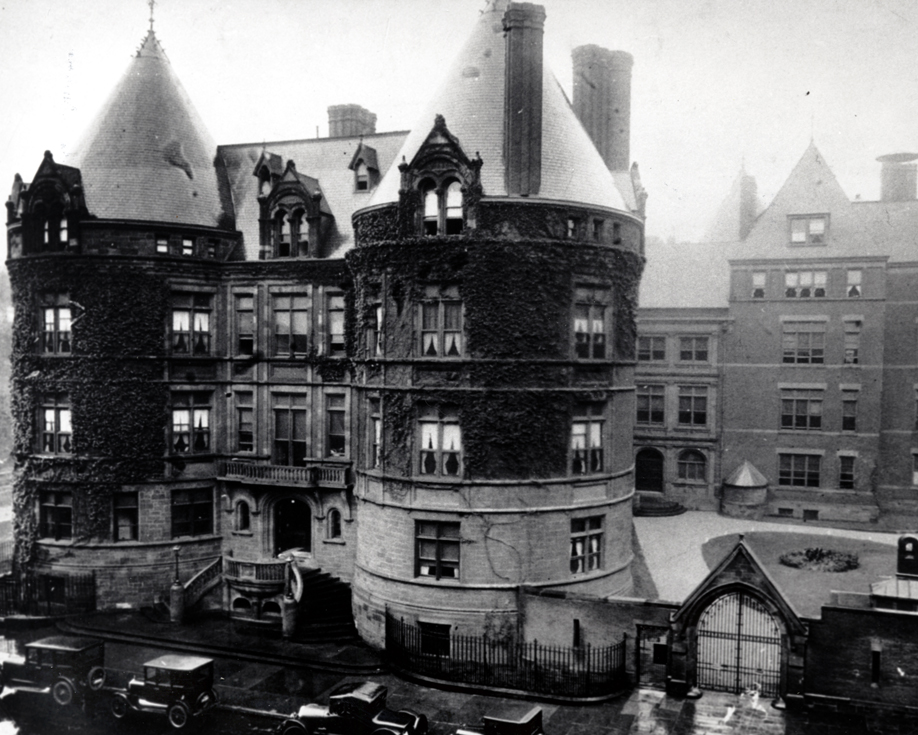
Memorial Hospital, 1930

The hospital was founded in its original building on the Upper West Side of Manhattan in 1884 as New York Cancer Hospital by a group that included John Jacob Astor III and his wife Charlotte. The hospital appointed as an attending surgeon William B. Coley, who pioneered an early form of immunotherapy to eradicate tumors. Rose Hawthorne, daughter of author Nathaniel Hawthorne, trained there in the summer of 1896 before founding her own order, Dominican Sisters of Hawthorne. In 1899, the hospital was renamed General Memorial Hospital for the Treatment of Cancer and Allied Diseases. In 1902, Arabella Huntington made a US$100,000 (equivalent to $3.7 million in 2025) bequest in memory of her late husband Collis Potter Huntington to establish the first cancer research fund in the country, the Huntington Fund for Cancer Research.

Around 1910, James Ewing, a professor at Cornell University's medical college, established a collaboration with Memorial Hospital with the help and funding of industrialist and philanthropist James Douglas, who gave $100,000 (equivalent to $3.5 million in 2025) to endow twenty beds for clinical research, equipment for working with radium, and a clinical laboratory for that purpose. Douglas' enthusiasm and funding for development of radiation therapy for cancer inspired Ewing to become one of the pioneers in developing this treatment. Ewing soon took over effective leadership of clinical and laboratory research at Memorial. In 1916 the hospital was renamed again, dropping "General" to become known as Memorial Hospital for the Treatment of Cancer and Allied Diseases.

The first fellowship training program in the U.S. was created at Memorial in 1927, funded by the Rockefellers. In 1931 the then-most-powerful 900k-volt X-ray tube was put into use in radiation-based cancer treatment at Memorial; the tube had been built by General Electric over several years. In 1931 Ewing was formally appointed president of the hospital, a role he had effectively played until then, and was featured on the cover of Time magazine as "Cancer Man Ewing"; the accompanying article described his role as one of the most important cancer doctors of his era. He worked at the Memorial until his retirement, in 1939. Under his leadership, Memorial became a model for other cancer centers in the United States, combining patient care with clinical and laboratory research, and it was said of him that "the relationship of Ewing to the Memorial Hospital can best be expressed in the words of Emerson, 'Every institution is but the lengthening shadow of some man.' Dr. Ewing is the Memorial Hospital".

=== Memorial Hospital and the Sloan Kettering Institute (1934–1980) ===
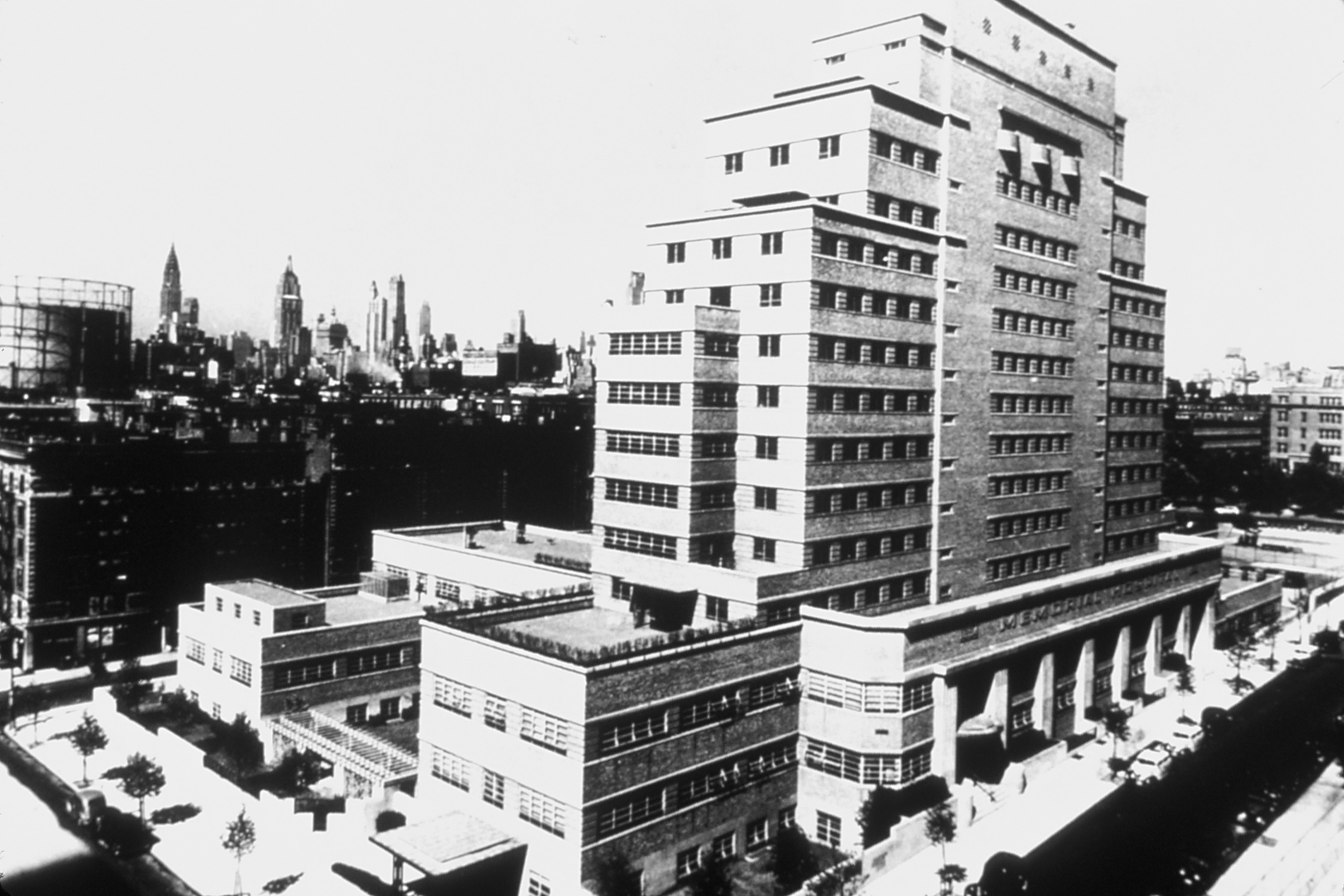
The relocated Memorial Hospital building, built between 1936 and 1939, standing on its present location on York Avenue

In 1934, John D. Rockefeller Jr. donated land on York Avenue for a new location. Two years later, he granted Memorial Hospital for the Treatment of Cancer and Allied Diseases (Memorial Hospital) $3.0 million (equivalent to $69.6 million in 2025) and the hospital began their move across town. Memorial Hospital officially reopened at the new location in 1939. In 1945, the chairman of General Motors, Alfred P. Sloan, donated $4.0 million (equivalent to $71.5 million in 2025) to create the Sloan-Kettering Institute for Cancer Research through his Sloan Foundation, and Charles F. Kettering, GM's vice president and director of research, donated ten thousand shares of GM stock worth $2 million and personally agreed to oversee the organization of a cancer research program based on industrial techniques. Both Sloan and Kettering had made considerable fortunes through their stake in Ethyl Corporation, which had made and marketed leaded gasoline since 1923. The originally independent research institute was built adjacent to Memorial Hospital.

In 1948, Cornelius P. Rhoads became the director of Memorial. Rhoads had run chemical weapons programs for the United States Army in World War II, and had been involved in the work that led to the discovery that nitrogen mustards could potentially be used as cancer drugs. He fostered a collaboration between Joseph H. Burchenal, a clinician at Memorial and Gertrude B. Elion and George H. Hitchings at Burroughs Wellcome, who discovered 6 MP; the collaboration led to the development and eventual wide use of this cancer drug.

From the mid-1950s to the mid-1960s Chester M. Southam conducted pioneering clinical research on virotherapy and cancer immunotherapy at MSK; however he conducted his research on people without their informed consent. He did this to patients under his care or others' care, and to prisoners. In 1963 some doctors objected to the lack of consent in his experiments and reported him to the Regents of the University of the State of New York which found him guilty of fraud, deceit, and unprofessional conduct, and in the end, he was placed on probation for a year. Southam's research experiments and the case at the Regents were covered in The New York Times.

In 1960, Memorial Sloan Kettering Cancer Center was formed as a new corporation to coordinate the two institutions, and John Heller, the former director of the National Cancer Institute was named its president. At the end of the 1960s, as the field of pediatric oncology began seeing success in treating children with cancer, Memorial opened an outpatient pediatric day hospital, partly to deal with the growing number of cancer survivors.

In the early 1970s, Burchenal and Benno Schmidt, a professional investor and trustee of MSK, were appointed to the presidential panel that initiated the U.S. federal government's war on cancer in the early 1970s. When Congress passed the National Cancer Act of 1971 as part of that effort, Memorial Sloan Kettering was designated as one of only three Comprehensive Cancer Centers nationwide.

In 1977, Jimmie C. Holland established a full-time psychiatric service at MSK dedicated to helping people with cancer cope with their disease and its treatment; it was one of the first such programs and was part of the creation of the field of psycho-oncology.

=== Memorial Sloan Kettering Cancer Center (1980–present) ===
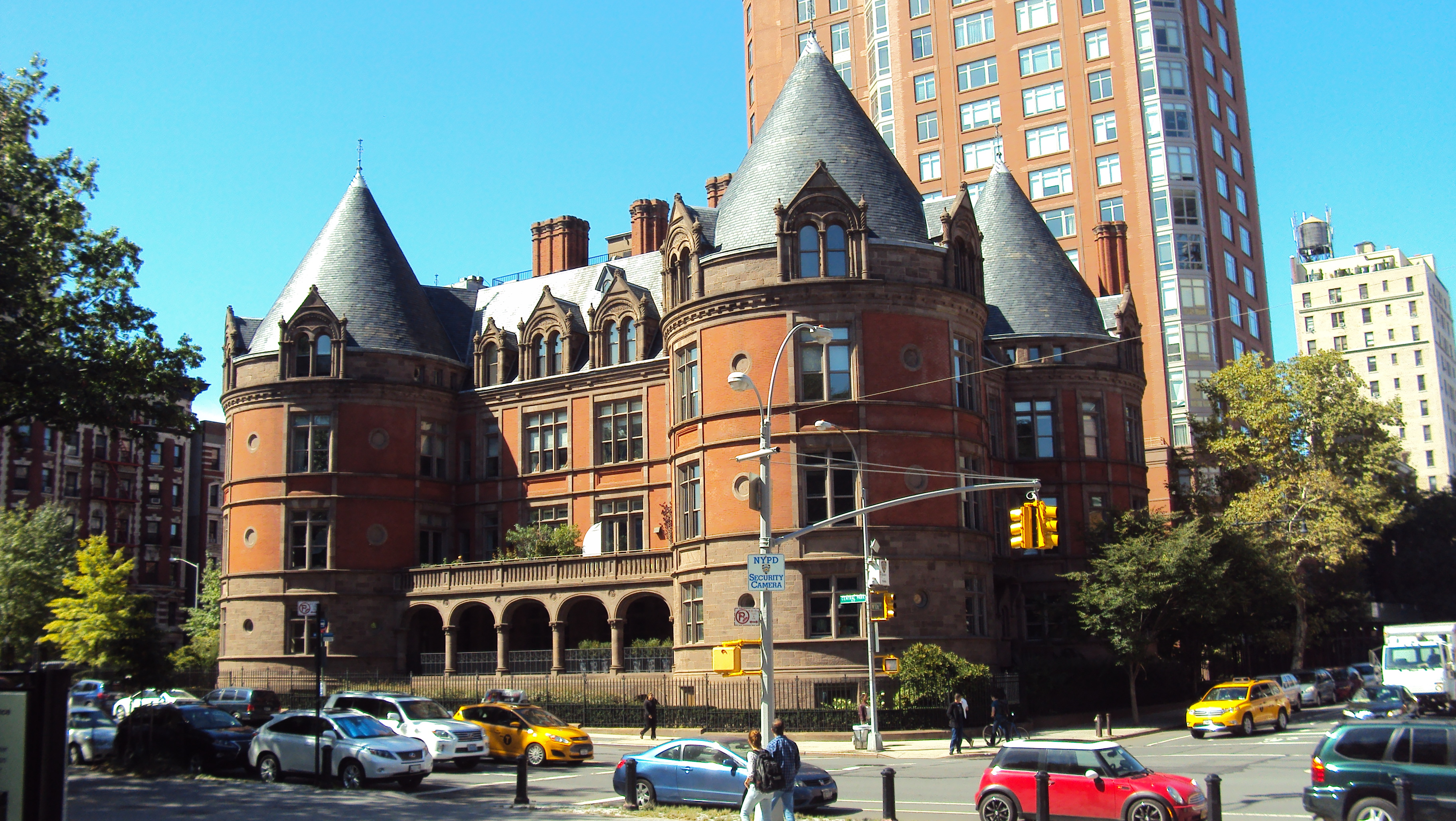
The original New York Cancer Hospital built between 1884 and 1886, now housing, at 455 Central Park West and 106th Street in Manhattan

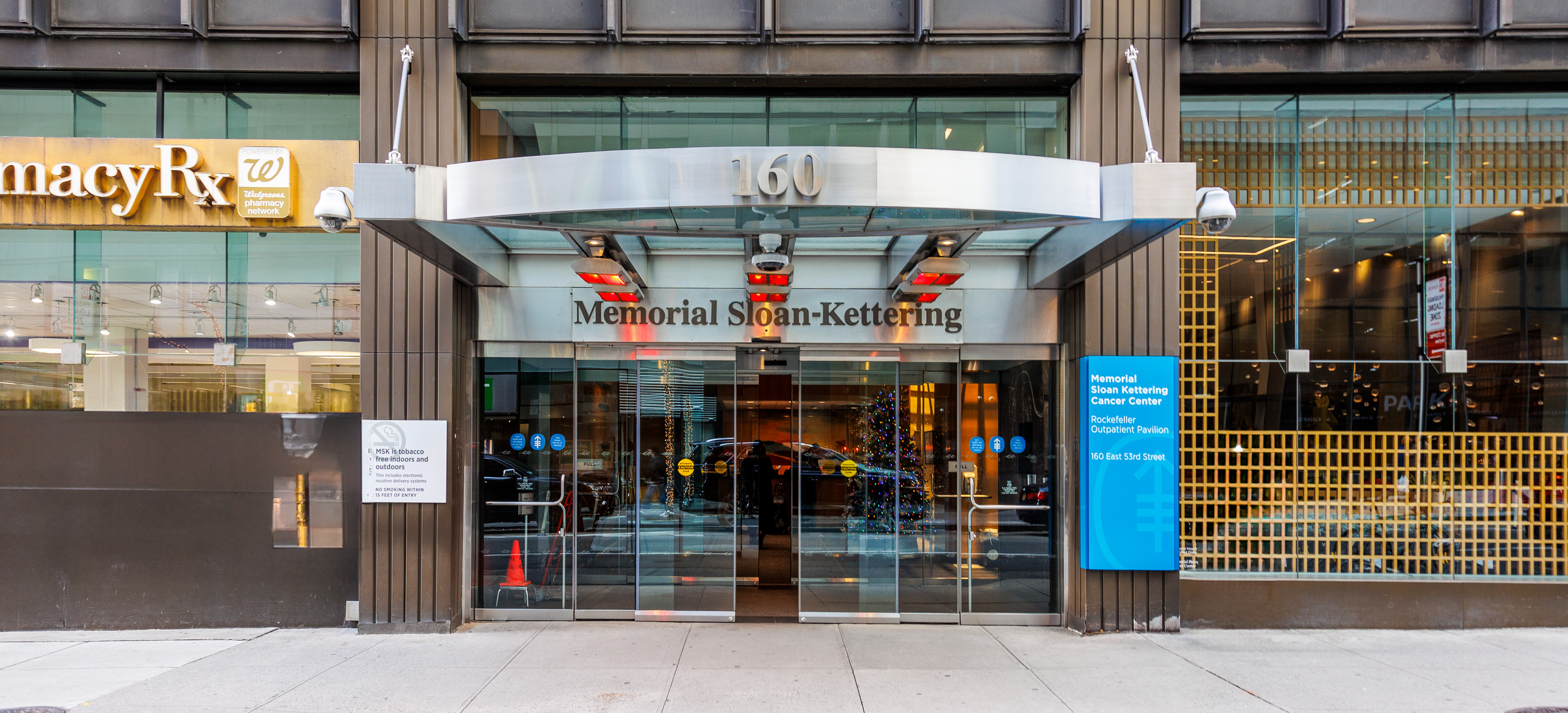
The Rockefeller Outpatient Pavilion, at 160 E 53rd Street

In 1980, Memorial Hospital and the Sloan-Kettering Institute formally merged into a single entity under the name Memorial Sloan Kettering Cancer Center. In 1985, Karl Welte, Erich Platzer, Janice Gabrilove, Roland Mertelsmann and Malcolm Moore at the Memorial Sloan Kettering Cancer Center (MSK) purified human G-CSF.

In 1986, the center patented the method of producing and using human G-CSF under the name "human hematopoietic pluripotent colony stimulating factor" (P-CSF). Also in 1986, Shigekazu Nagata's team and Lawrence Souza's team at Amgen cloned the G-CSF gene for production and its clinical use.

In 1990 it entered an agreement with Amgen to receive royalties for the recombinant granulocyte colony-stimulating factor, the basis for neupogen and neulasta, earning the institute over $100 million.

In 2000, former NIH director Harold Varmus became director of MSK. During his tenure, he helped build new facilities, strengthened the bond between MSK's clinical and research arms, and fostered collaborations with other institutions, including Weill-Cornell Medical College and Rockefeller University.

In 2006, MSK opened the Mortimer B. Zuckerman Research Center, a 23-story building that houses over 100 laboratories. In 2009 it opened the Evelyn H. Lauder Breast Center.

In 2010, Craig B. Thompson, an oncologist and researcher, was appointed MSK's president and CEO. The following year, MSK was rated the third most successful nonprofit in terms of FDA-approved drugs and vaccines, behind the National Institutes of Health and the University of California system. In 2012, Thompson appointed José Baselga as physician-in-chief, who directed the clinical side of MSK. That same year, a collaboration with IBM's Watson was announced with the goal of developing new tools and resources to better tailor diagnostic and treatment recommendations for patients. The director of SKI, the research arm of MSK, Joan Massagué was appointed in 2013. Baselga resigned in September 2018 after information came out regarding millions of dollars he received from pharmaceutical companies without disclosing a financial conflict of interest.

In 2015 it opened the Josie Robertson Surgery Center for outpatient surgeries, named in honor of the wife of philanthropist Julian Robertson.

In 2017, the Food and Drug Administration approved an MSK-developed immunotherapy, CAR-T, for certain applications in leukemia and lymphoma. The FDA approved the first academic or commercial tumor identification test MSK-IMPACT in November 2018.

In 2020 it opened The David H. Koch Center for Cancer Care as an outpatient facility.

In April 2022, MSK announced a $50 million donation from The Starr Foundation to aid in expanding funding for basic cancer research and discovery science. The donation will establish The Starr Foundation programme for Discovery Science at the Sloan Kettering Institute, the goal of the institute is to drive next-generation cancer breakthroughs.

In June 2022, a small trial of an experimental treatment found that tumors vanished in all 14 patients diagnosed with early stage rectal cancer who completed the study by the time it was published.

In 2023 MSK received a donation of $400 million from David Geffen and Kenneth C. Griffin.

In 2025, cancer patient Jennifer Capasso sued MSK over remarks about her transgender identity while she was under sedation during a surgical procedure in 2022, and subsequent alleged discrimination by the hospital staff.

MSK has expanded into regional sites, including in Westchester County, New York, Commack, Hauppauge, Rockville Centre on Long Island, and Bergen County, Monmouth County, and Basking Ridge in New Jersey.

MSK currently employs over 1,200 physicians and treats patients with approximately 400 types of cancer annually.

== Associated facilities and programs ==
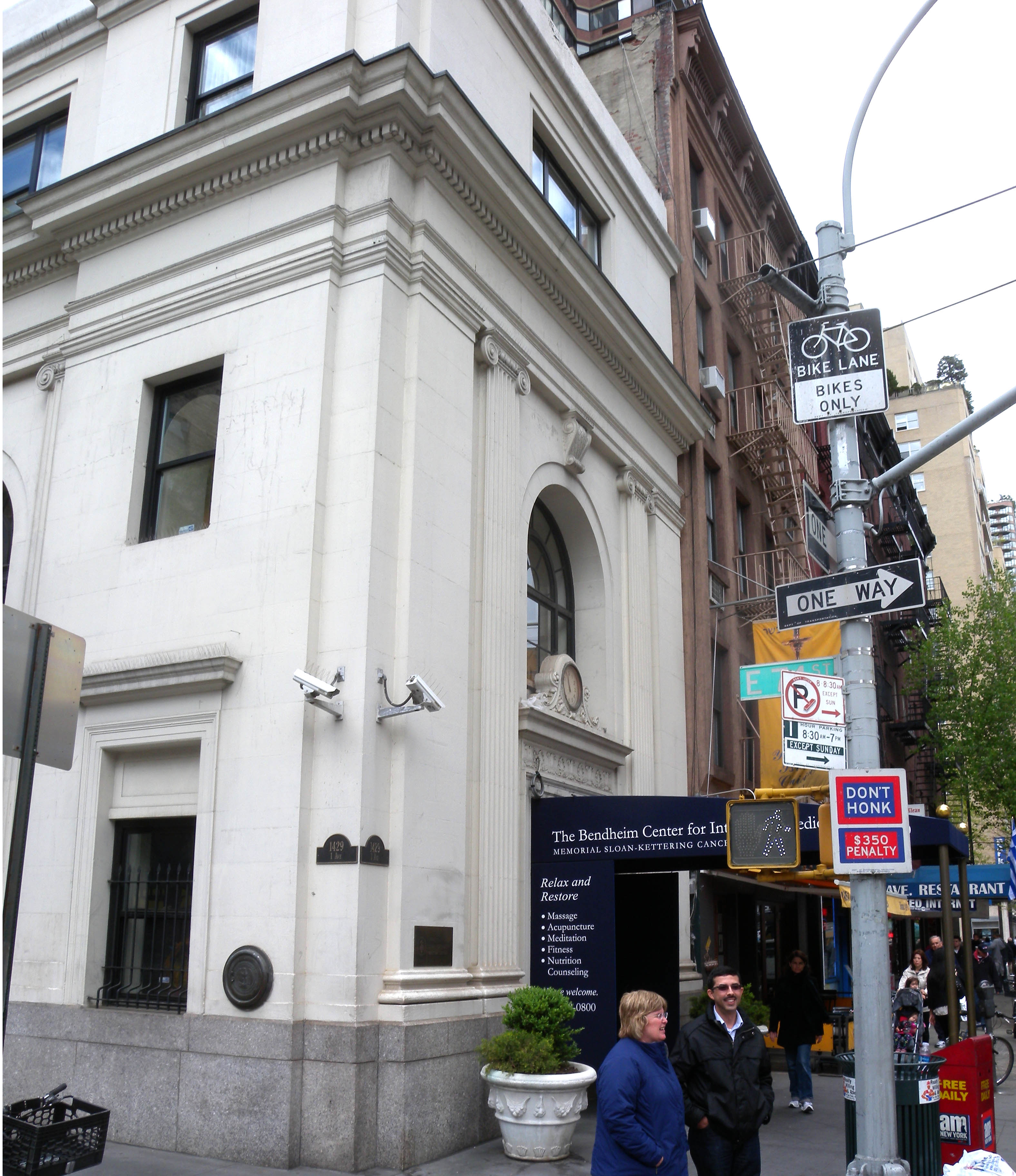
The Bendheim Integrative Medicine Center

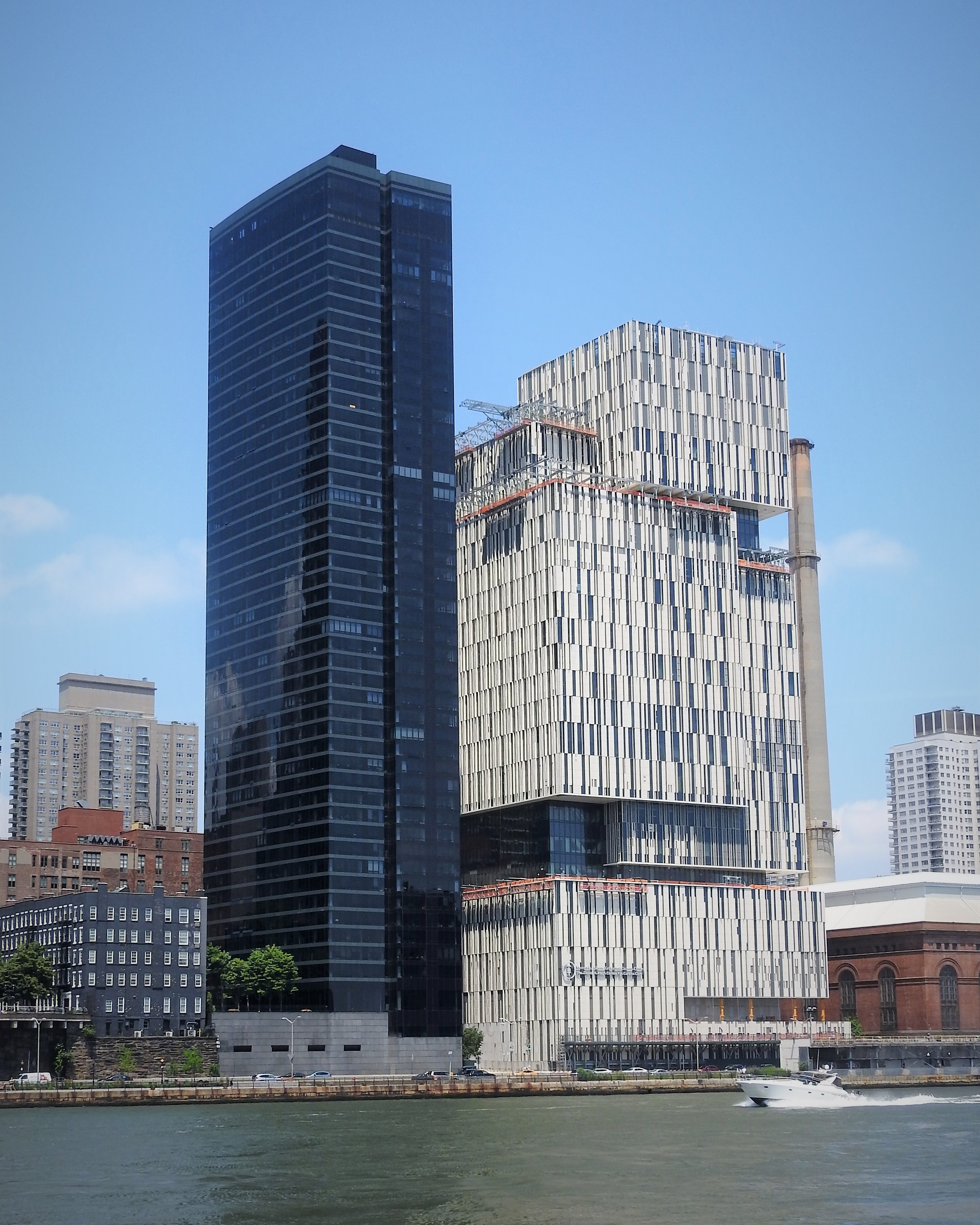
The Koch Center (right)

The Memorial Sloan Kettering Bendheim Integrative Medicine Center is a stand alone outpatient facility developed from the Integrative Medicine Service that began in 1999.

The Center for Image-Guided Intervention was opened in June 2010 in the Memorial Hospital building to oversee image guiding activities across MSK. In October 2012, the Sillerman Center for Rehabilitation was opened, moving rehabilitation out of Memorial Hospital and closer to the Rockefeller Outpatient Pavilion.

The New York Proton Center opened in 2019 as a partnership between Memorial Sloan Kettering, Montefiore Health, and Mount Sinai Health System. The center was the first proton therapy center to open in New York state. The David H. Koch Center for Cancer Care at Memorial Sloan Kettering Cancer Center opened at 530 East 74th Street between York Avenue and FDR Drive January 2020. Perkins Eastman designed 750,000 sq ft facility in collaboration with Ennead Architects and ICRAVE. Thornton Tomasetti served as structural engineer, with Jaros, Baum & Bolles providing MEP engineering.

=== India Center ===
The center launched its India facility in Chennai in August 2022, to provide telemedicine services in collaboration with iCiliniq to facilitate second opinion from the cancer specialists, without the need to travel to a U.S. facility.

== Training ==
Approximately 1,700 medical residents and Fellows are in training at MSK. There are 575 postdoctoral researchers training at MSK labs and a combined 288 PhD and MD-PhD candidates.

In 2004, the Louis V. Gerstner, Jr. Graduate School of Biomedical Sciences was opened at Memorial Sloan Kettering Cancer Center. The first students graduated in 2012. As of January 2019, the dean of the graduate school is cell biologist Michael Overholtzer. The founding dean, serving for over a decade, was molecular biologist Ken Marians.

The Tri-Institutional MD–PhD Program is a partnership of MSKCC, Weill Cornell Medicine, and The Rockefeller University. The dual degree program takes advantage of the close proximity of these three institutions for collaboration on biomedical research and medical training. MSKCC also has an academic partnership with Weill Cornell Medicine known as the Weill Cornell Graduate School of Medical Sciences.

== Notable faculty ==
=== Presidents ===
The following individuals have served as president, first of the overarching corporation (1960–1980), and later of the combined hospital (1980 onwards).

- John R. Heller, 1960–1961
- Richard D. Vanderwarker, 1962–1971
- David Walsh, 1971–1973
- Lewis Thomas, 1973–1980
- Paul A. Marks, 1980–1999
- Harold Varmus, 2000–2010
- Craig B. Thompson, 2010–2022
- Selwyn M. Vickers, 2022–

=== Presidents of the Memorial Hospital for Cancer and Allied Diseases ===
- John E. Parsons, 1884–1915
- Herbert Parsons, 1915–1917
- George C. Clark, 1917–1919
- Herbert Parsons, 1919–1923
- Walter Douglas, 1924–1932
- Harry P. Robbins, 1933–1944
- Reginald G. Coombe, 1945–1950
- Laurance Rockefeller, 1950–1958
- B. Brewster Jennings, 1958–1961
- Ogden White, 1962–1964
- John M. Walker, 1965–1973
- James D. Robinson III, 1974–1980

=== Presidents of the Sloan Kettering Institute ===
- Frank A. Howard, 1945–1959
- Frank L. Horsfall, 1960–1971
- Leo Wade, 1971–1972
- Robert A. Good, 1973–1980

=== Others ===
- James P. Allison
- Kathryn V. Anderson
- Esther Babady
- Doris L. Berryman
- Edward Boyse
- Murray Brennan
- Carol L. Brown
- Samuel Danishefsky
- Nori Dattatreyudu
- Lisa DeAngelis
- Jeffrey Drebin
- Jimmie C. Holland
- Jerard Hurwitz
- Maria Jasin
- Alex Kentsis
- David Kissane
- Mathilde Krim
- Iris Long
- Scott W. Lowe
- Joan Massagué
- John Mendelsohn
- Kenneth Offit
- Lloyd Old
- Nikola P. Pavletich
- Mark S. Ptashne
- Ora Mendelsohn Rosen
- James Rothman
- Alexander Rudensky
- Valerie Rusch
- Michel Sadelain
- Charles Sawyers
- Lorenz Studer

== Reputation ==
In 2015, Charity Watch rated Memorial Sloan Kettering Cancer Center an "A". That same year, heads of the charity received $2,107,939 to $2,639,669 salary/compensation from the charity. CEO Craig B. Thompson received $2,554,085 salary/compensation from the charity.

== See also ==
- National Comprehensive Cancer Network
- Tri-Institutional MD–PhD Program
- Weill Cornell Graduate School of Medical Sciences
