= Psycho-oncology =

Psychological and social aspects of cancer

Psycho-oncology is an interdisciplinary field at the intersection of physical, psychological, social, and behavioral aspects of the cancer experience for both patients and caregivers. Also known as psychiatric oncology or psychosocial oncology, researchers and practitioners in the field are concerned with aspects of individuals' experience with cancer beyond medical treatment, and across the cancer trajectory, including at diagnosis, during treatment, transitioning to and throughout survivorship, and approaching the end-of-life.

Founded by Jimmie C. Holland in 1977 via the incorporation of a psychiatric service within the Memorial Sloan Kettering Cancer Center in New York, the field has expanded and is recognized as integral to cancer care. Cancer centers in major academic medical centers across the U.S. now uniformly provide psycho-oncology services.

This represents a major step forward in terms of care for the whole patient. Beyond psychological reactions to the experience of cancer and the behavioral component of coping with cancer, practitioners and researchers are interested in health behavior change and preventive medicine, and social factors associated with cancer diagnosis and treatment, including care coordination, family involvement, and social support.

Many cancer centers support research in the field, and research related to the influence of psychosocial factors on biological disease-related processes has burgeoned over the past two decades. Much of it takes a biopsychosocial approach to account for the interplay between biological, psychological, and social factors in coping with cancer.

== Psychological ==
Diagnosis and treatment of cancer is known to influence psychological well-being to a significant degree. Rates of psychological distress are elevated for most individuals who have been diagnosed with cancer when compared to population norms. Common psychological reactions to cancer are mood and anxiety-related concerns. Elevated rates of depression and anxiety in response to a cancer diagnosis is often attributable to uncertainty regarding mortality and well as going through arduous treatments and concerns related to functional interference and body-image or other self-concept related distress. Understanding how individuals react psychologically to cancer is important to support their overall well-being and maximize quality of life during treatment and beyond. While the prevalence of psychological disturbance in reaction to cancer is relatively high when compared to population norms, many individuals report fairly stable psychological well-being through the cancer trajectory and some even report improved psychological well-being.

=== Depression and anxiety ===
Common psychological reactions to cancer (same) diagnosis and treatment include depressive symptoms and anxiety. Factors that may contribute to clinically significant anxiety and depression in the context of cancer include threat to life, uncertainty regarding prognosis and treatment outcome, worry regarding toxic treatments, functional impairment as a result of toxic treatments, and physical symptoms themselves, commonly including fatigue, pain, nausea, neuropathy, and chemo brain. These topics have been incorporated into psychotherapy treatments tailored to the experience of living with cancer. While the majority of individuals diagnosed with cancer do not exhibit clinically significant symptoms of depression or anxiety, prevalence after cancer diagnosis is substantially higher than population norms. While psychological well-being during cancer is associated with higher quality of life, evidence for a relationship with survival remains unclear and inconsistent. For example, psychological interventions for patients with early-stage cancer have been found to increase quality of life, but their effect on overall survival has not been consistently demonstrated.

=== Coping ===
Psychological and behavioral responses by individuals to diagnosis and treatment of cancer in an effort to manage the substantial stress and threat to health are of primary interest in the field of psycho-oncology. These responses constitute what can be referred to as one's coping response to a health threat. Cognitive adaptation to cancer is particularly challenging due to the multiple domains that cancer treatment affects. There are two broad categories of coping behavior, including approach-oriented oping and avoidance-oriented coping.

Approach coping construes cognitive, behavioral, and emotion facets of adjustment to cancer including expressing emotions, taking an active role in one's own treatment, remaining active, and discussing difficulties with loved ones. Generally, research supports the idea that the use of approach-oriented coping supports more positive adjustments and psychological well-being than avoidance-oriented coping.

Avoidance coping is an individual's maladaptive attempt to mitigate psychological damage from a stressful event. Emotional suppression and avoidance of discussion related to the topic of cancer, as well as passive behaviors preclude individuals from directly managing the concerns that are giving rise to psychological distress. Many psychological treatments are designed to enhance individuals' ability to implement more adaptive coping behaviors and cognitions and reduce maladaptive coping.

=== Positive psychological reactions ===
==== Benefit finding and post traumatic growth ====
Benefit finding is a cognitive process in which individuals identify positive contributions that a diagnosis of cancer has made to their lives. It is an example of a positively oriented coping strategy or approach oriented coping strategy. For example, an individual may identify that diagnosis of cancer led them to consider what really matters in life, subsequently leading them to an increased quality of life. Research primary conducted with breast cancer survivors has shown that interventions to increase the identification of benefits to a highly stressful experience like cancer diagnosis can improve quality of life.

Post traumatic growth is significant to cancer diagnosis due to the potentially life threatening nature of the diagnosis. Individuals may be forced to consider their own mortality and may adapt by altering the way they relate to others, the world, and even themselves. Some patients refer to "the gift of cancer" due to it inspiring them to look closely at their lives or deaths and make changes to improve both.

Cancer presents individuals with a major health threat that often challenges one's sense of self as they attempt to navigate changes to their lives as a result of diagnosis and treatment. Meaning making is the effort to restore order and purpose to people's lives that has been changed so drastically by the disease. Meaning making can be a part of a positive growth process that occurs after diagnosis with cancer and is associated with greater quality of life and well-being.

== Behavioral ==
In addition to behavioral responses to cognitive reactions to diagnosis and treatment, the field of psycho-oncology addresses behaviors associated with risk of developing cancer and behaviors that place individuals at risk of poor disease outcomes. Included in this domain of interest are preventive medicine behaviors of smoking cessation and use of skin protection as well as adherence to treatment regimens.

=== Health promoting behaviors and preventive medicine ===
Behavior modification to reduce the risk of developing cancer is a major public health concern due to health care costs associated with individuals being treated for cancer. Behavior change falls squarely within the interests of the field of psycho-oncology due to the psychological factors associated with implementing behavior change. Chief behaviors that are targeted to decrease individuals' risk for cancer are: smoking and alcohol consumption, diet and exercise, and sun exposure. These behaviors are known to increase (or decrease, in the case of exercise and diet) the likelihood of developing cancer in addition to a myriad other health conditions.

Engagement with screening procedures is also of importance with regard to cancer prevention and in some cancers an underutilized resource. Fear and anxiety are barriers for some to getting screened for cancer. However, cancer screening presents the opportunity to catch tumors that are present in very early stages and avoid intensive, systemic treatments in favor or more acute and localized treatments with a higher chance of cancer cure (e.g., surgical resection).

Behavioral modification is also relevant to improving the quality of life of those who are living with cancer. For example, a common and debilitating symptom of cancer is fatigue. However, a prescribed treatment for fatigue is to engage in a higher level of physical activity, despite its difficulty. Low intensity and mindful forms of physical exercise have emerged including yoga and tai chi that have been shown to help with fatigue and pain and improve overall physical and psychological quality of life.

=== Treatment adherence ===
Historically, terminology related to the uptake of treatment by the patient was referred to as compliance, implying a more passive role on the part of the patient, and a more clearly delineated hierarchy between the doctor and patient. However, modern models of ethical treatment call for more equality between patient and provider and discussion related to treatment has shifted towards adherence. Adherence to medical treatment is of crucial importance to managing cancer effectively and is a topic that largely falls under the purview of psycho-oncology due to the cognitive-behavioral causes for lack of treatment adherence. A number of factors can contribute to lack of treatment adherence including toxic side effects, misinformation or lack of understanding of treatment regimen, lack of communication with medical providers, and lack of medical support (e.g., treatment self-management), in addition to psychological factors like depression and anxiety. Treatment adherence has become an increasingly important topic of study in psycho-oncology due to the advent and proliferation of oral antineoplastics. Individuals on oral chemotherapy must manage sometimes complex treatment regimens at home, on their own, and be able to communicate effectively with treatment providers to manage toxic side effects that may influence their ability or willingness to take the prescribed drug without the assistance of nursing as in traditional intravenous chemotherapy.

== Social ==
=== Caregiving ===
It is estimated that nearly a quarter of adults diagnosed with cancer have dependent children. Parenting can add considerable stress for these individuals and is often cited among the most demanding aspects of coping with a cancer diagnosis.

=== Social support and isolation ===
During a stressful experience such as cancer diagnosis, social connections can provide valuable emotional and practical support. Research in the broader field of Health Psychology has revealed significant influences of social support on the psychological well-being of individuals as well as associations with disease processes, particularly in cardiovascular disease. Patients undergoing treatment for cancer often rely on a social support network of varying size, including spouses, children, friends and other family, to support them through difficult treatments and functional impairment. These types of social support refer to instrumental social support and are related to task-based support. Additionally, the emotional toll that cancer diagnosis can take on a person necessitates a degree of emotional support from the support network. Both instrumental and emotional social support have been shown in research to improve quality of life in patients being treated for cancer.

Conversely, a diagnosis of cancer can be significantly socially isolating for individuals. Life changes including functional impairment may separate people from their friends and family, and a shift from "healthy" to "ill" in terms of self-identity can lead to a sense of social isolation as well. Research has shown that social isolation and perceptions of loneliness have significant negative impact on physical and psychological quality of life in individuals with cancer.

=== Communication ===
Communication with medical providers and loved ones has been identified as an important social factor throughout the cancer trajectory. Communication has been shown to be associated with improved medication adherence and satisfaction with care. CBT-based interventions have incorporated strategies for communication with providers about topics including symptom management and prognostic understanding. Additionally, open communication between patients and caregivers is associated with improved quality of life in patients and caregivers. Having an open communication within the family of the cancer patient is also important for the well-being of the entire family.

=== Couple relationships ===
Cancer may affect romantic relationships in both positive and negative ways. For many, going through this difficult time can result in greater emotional closeness, re-evaluation of priorities and deeper appreciation of their relationship. However, cancer can also lead to difficulties with sexual intimacy, fertility concerns and changes in relationship roles and expectations.

== Biological ==
=== Stress pathways to disease ===
Knowledge from other fields of health psychology, prominently including psychosocial contributors to cardiovascular disease risk and outcomes, led to the exploration of the influence of psychological factors on biological processes associated with cancer. As knowledge of biological processes related to cancer development and progression advance so too does that knowledge of the association between biological processes, namely inflammation and psychological processes. Research has revealed bio-behavioral pathways to disease which indicates that importance of treatment of psychological concerns that emerge as a result of a cancer diagnosis in efforts to reduce the likelihood of cancer progression. Additionally, knowledge continues to advance related to treatment refractory symptoms of cancer including pain and fatigue that may be biobehaviorally driven which has advanced novel treatment approaches.

== Psychosocial treatment models ==
=== Adaptations of CBT, ACT, other effective interventions ===
Multiple evidence-based treatments for mood and anxiety disorders in the general population have been adapted to deal with stressors directly related to cancer. Common maladaptive cognitions that are associated with cancer include misinterpreting pain or other physical sensations as cancer progression, or struggling to adapt to the uncertainty of treatment and life after treatment. Cognitive behavioral therapy and related psychotherapies are particularly well suited to manage these cognitive concerns that emerge throughout the cancer process and serve to interfere with individuals' quality of life. CBT and adjacent therapies have also been used to support management of chronic pain and fatigue that patients treatment with chemotherapy often experience, helping to improve both their interpretations of the symptoms but also help manage their lives behaviorally in the context of functional impairment. In this context, the influence of improved self-regulation on survival in people with breast cancer and colon cancer was also investigated.

=== Mindfulness ===
Mindfulness is a burgeoning area of interest as a common element across multiple modalities in mental health treatment, having shown effectiveness in ameliorating depressive symptoms and anxiety. Mindfulness-based stress reduction specifically intended to help patients with cancer has been proven effective for decreasing levels of cancer-related distress. More recently, digitally delivered psychotherapy is being investigated as a low cost, highly accessible treatment method.

=== Routine distress screening ===
With awareness of the prevalence of psychological distress that accompanies a cancer diagnosis and increased efforts to integrate evidence-based psychosocial treatments into overall oncologic care, screening for adjustment to diagnosis and treatment became more widespread. Routine distress screening throughout the cancer process (e.g., diagnosis, treatment, survivorship) is crucial to identifying individuals who are already struggling with symptoms of depression or anxiety or for identifying those at risk for psychological issues related to cancer. Historically, communication about psychological adjustment was lacking between patients and providers regarding topics related to adjustment to diagnosis, living with cancer, living cancer-free in survivorship, or transitioning to end of life care. The stigmatized nature of psychological concerns made it difficult to identify those patients who could benefit from early intervention to prevent or attenuate symptoms of depression or anxiety that may emerge.
