= Hilbert Museum of California Art =

The Hilbert Museum of California Art
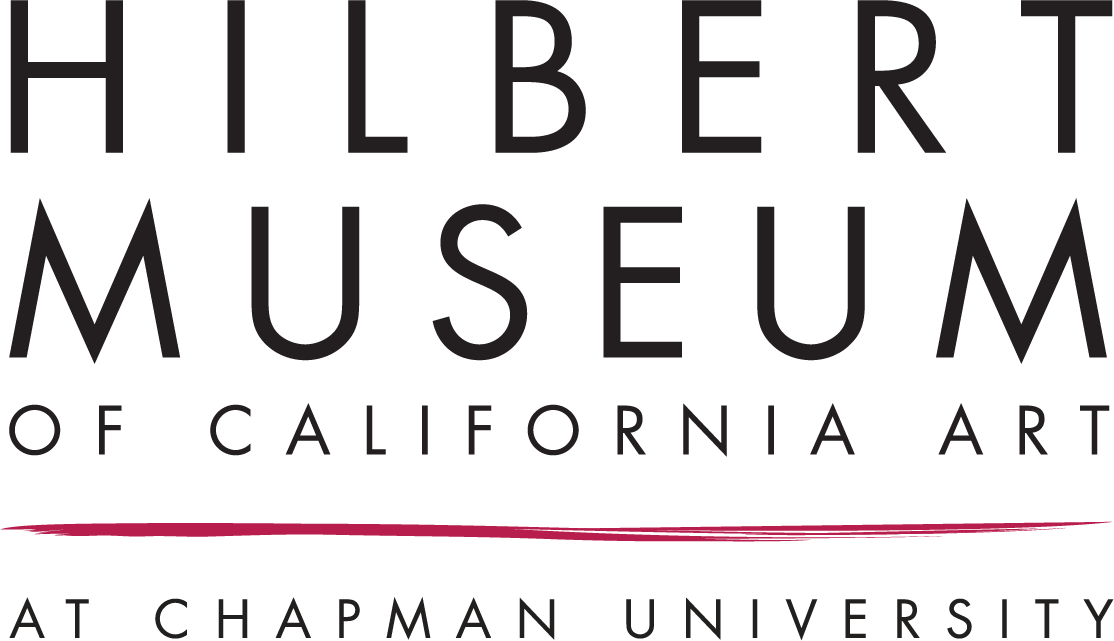
- Established: 2015
- Location: 167 N Atchison St., Orange, California
- Coordinates: 33.7890°N 117.8566°W
- Type: Contemporary art museum
- Visitors: 51,000 in 2024
- Director: Mary Platt
- Website: www.hilbertmuseum.com

The Hilbert Museum of California Art is a U.S. museum located at Chapman University in Orange, California. The museum's growing collection encompasses more than 5,000 pieces – including oils, watercolors and drawings of urban and industrial scenes, coastal views, and landscapes of everyday life in California, one of the largest private collections of Disney art, and works by Norman Rockwell and other 20th Century illustrators acquired by the Hilberts since 1992. Among the museum’s most celebrated works are those by luminaries Millard Sheets, Emil Kosa Jr., Mary Blair, Phil Dike, Milford Zornes, and Rex Brandt. A portion of the Hilbert collection will be displayed in the Museum’s permanent collection along with rotating temporary exhibits will be scheduled.

== History ==
The Hilbert Museum of California Art, located in the historic district of Old Towne Orange, opened in 2016. It was founded by Mark and Janet Hilbert with a gift of $10 million, including a collection of more than 5,000 paintings valued at more than $7 million in 2015. The collection consists mostly of works in oil and watercolor created between the 1930s and the 1970s by artists – including Millard Sheets, Emil Kosa Jr., Phil Dike, Milford Zornes and Rex Brandt – of the California Scene Painting movement, a form of American regionalist art depicting scenes of everyday life involving landscapes, places, and people of California. The museum also features regular exhibitions of works of American illustrators, as well as the motion-picture production art and animation art created by many of the California Scene artists, who found work in the movie studios during the Great Depression.

== Expansion ==
The museum expanded from its original 7,500 square feet (700 m^{2}) to 22,500 square feet (2,090 m^{2}) and reopened in February 2024 after three years of construction. The price of the expansion was planned to be around $14 million, and the goal is to have approximately 100,000 visitors per year by 2025.
