= Marian Curtis =

American artist

- self portrait c. 1945
- Born: February 12, 1912; Los Angeles, California
- Died: November 12, 1972 (aged 60); Los Angeles, California
- Known for: Painting

Marian Curtis (February 12, 1882 – November 12, 1944) was an American painter known for her landscapes.

== Biography ==
Curtis was born on February 12, 1912, in Los Angeles, California. She attended the Chouinard Art Institute where her teachers included Phil Dike and Pruett Carter She was married to John Manning. During the 1930s Curtis created art for the Works Progress Administration (WPA). She was a member of the Laguna Beach Art Association where she exhibited her work from 1938 through 1943. During the same period she exhibited at the California Water Color Society. Curtis died on November 12, 1972, in Los Angeles.

Her work is in the collection of the San Diego Museum of Art, and the Smithsonian American Art Museum.

== Gallery ==
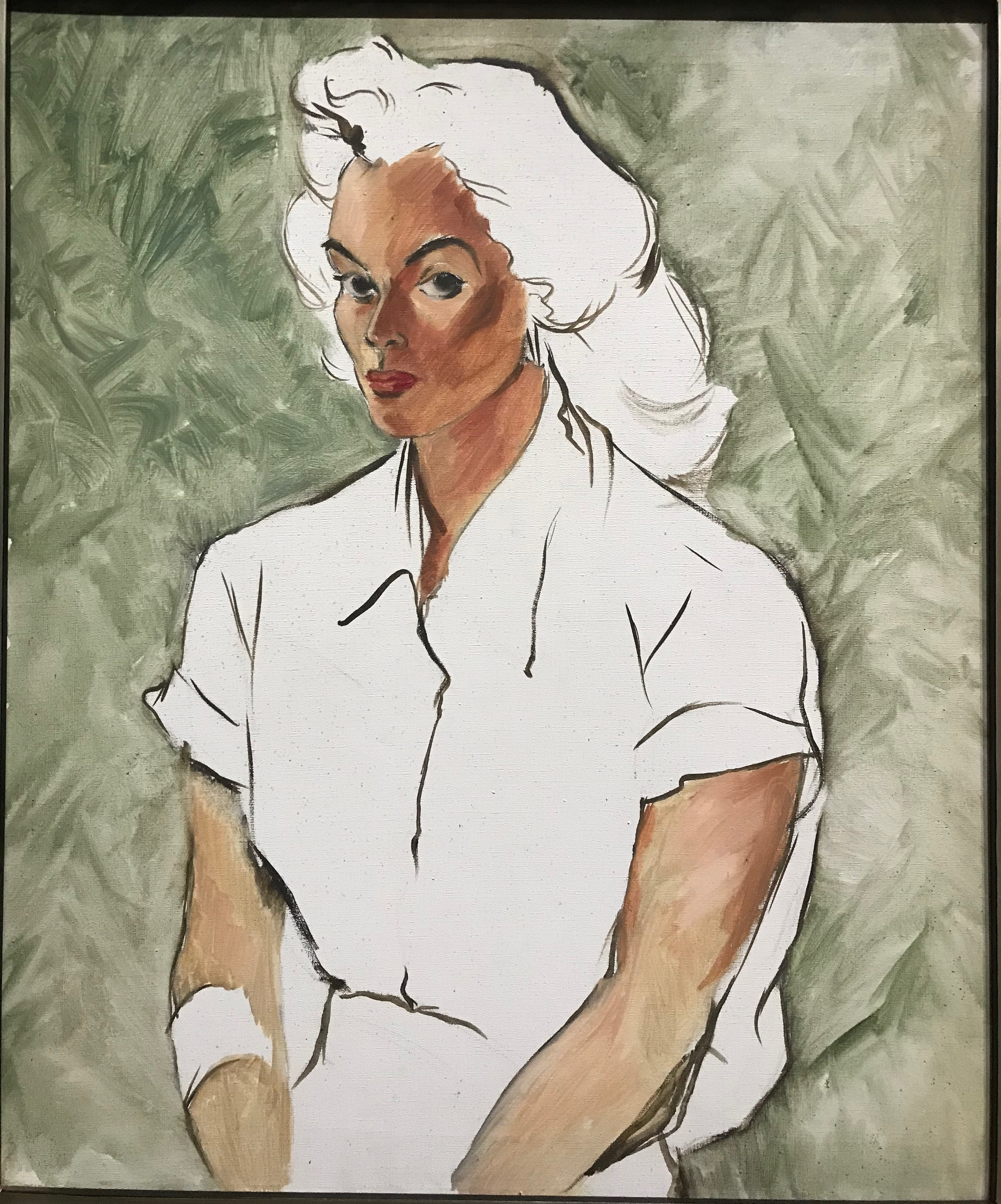
Untitled--Unfinished Self-Portrait by Marian Curtis.

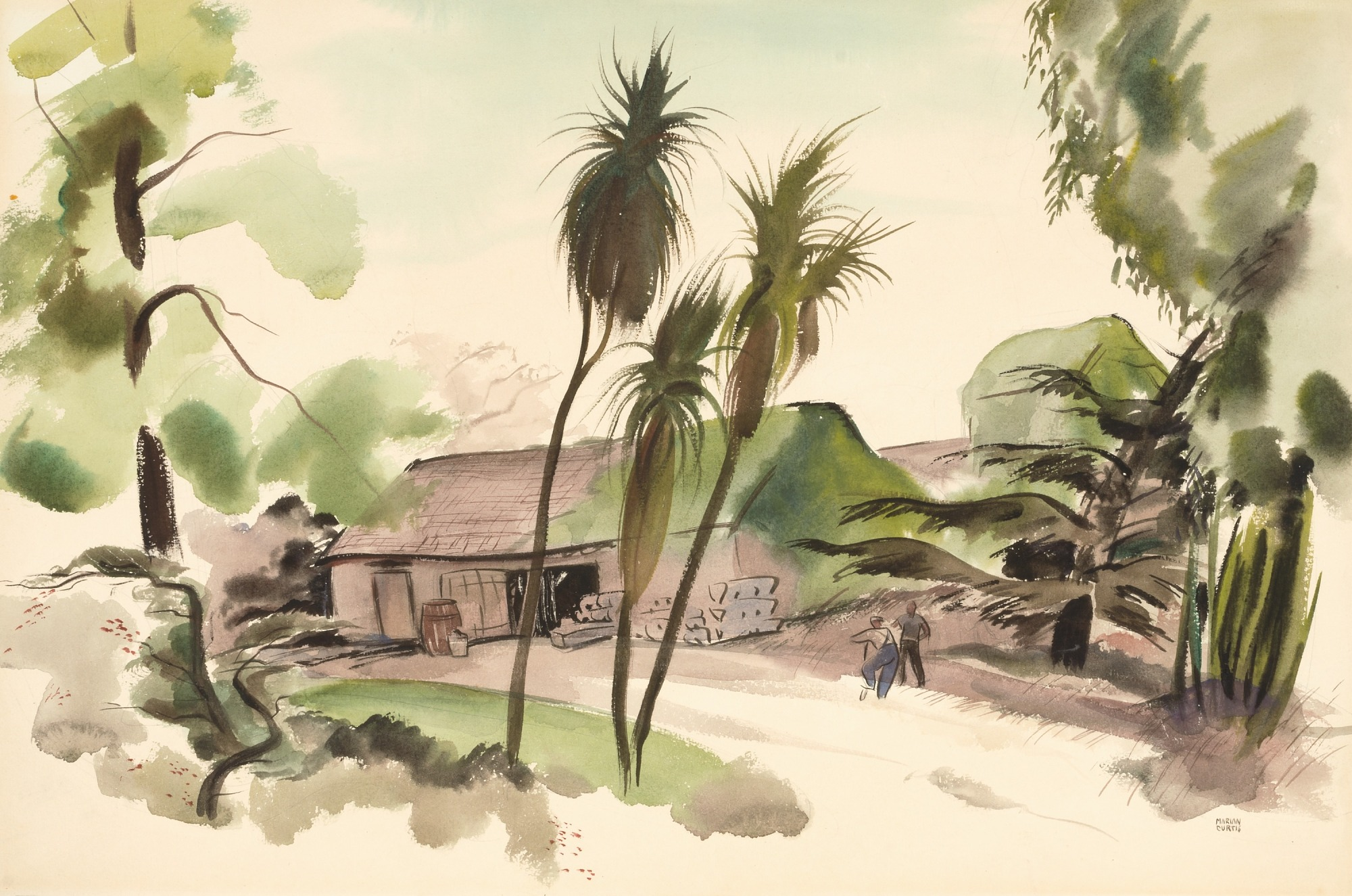
Ranch Scene circa 1939.
