= Watercolor painting =

Type of painting method

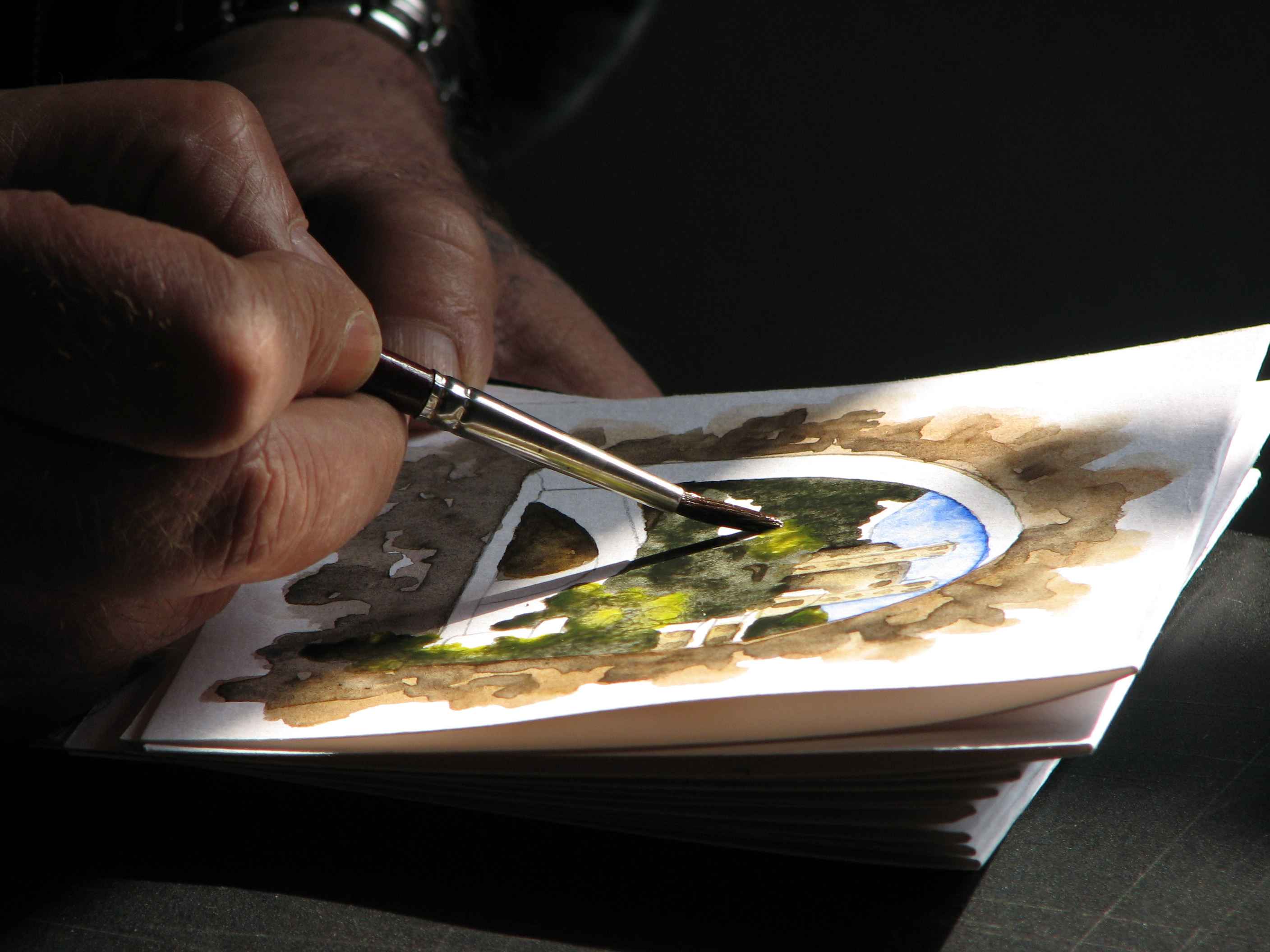
An artist working on a watercolor using a round brush

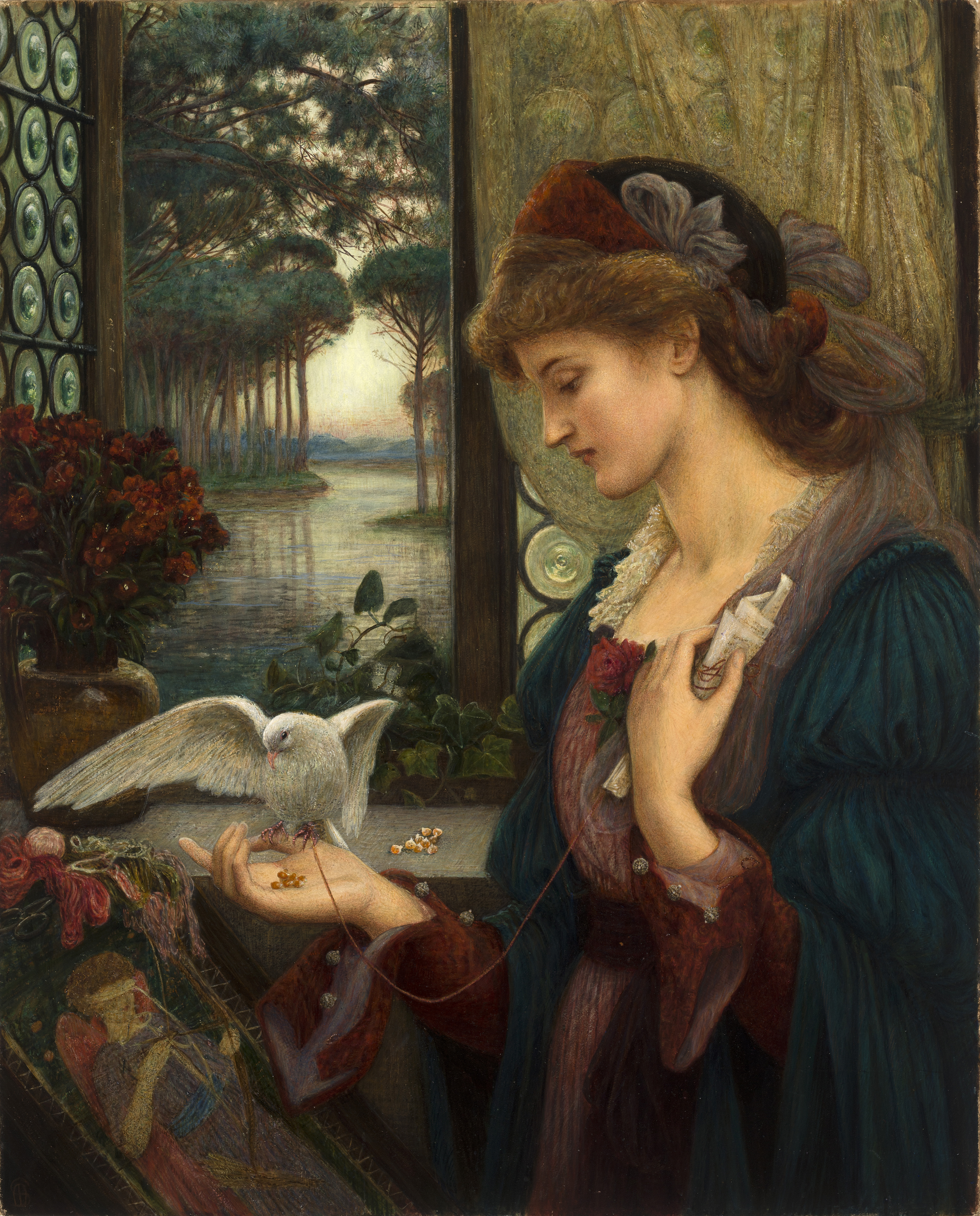
Love's Messenger, an 1885 watercolor and tempera by Marie Spartali Stillman

Watercolor (American English) or watercolour (Commonwealth English; see spelling differences), also aquarelle (French: [akwaʁɛl]; from Italian diminutive of Latin aqua 'water'), is a painting method in which the paints are made of pigments suspended in a water-based solution. Watercolor refers to both the medium and the resulting artwork.

The conventional and most common support—material to which the paint is applied—for watercolor paintings is paper, usually special types of watercolor paper. Other supports or substrates include stone, ivory, silk, reed, papyrus, bark papers, plastics, vellum, leather, fabric, wood, and watercolor canvas (coated with a gesso that is specially formulated for use with watercolors). Watercolor paper is often made entirely or partially with cotton. This gives the surface the appropriate texture and minimizes distortion when wet. Watercolor papers are usually cold-pressed papers that provide better texture and appearance. Another variation is hot-pressed watercolor paper, which has a smoother texture and appearance than cold-pressed paper. Transparency is the main characteristic of watercolors. It is caused by the gum binder being absorbed by the paper, leaving a top layer of dispersed pigment particles, through which the paper shimmers. "It consists of a mixture of pigments, binders such as gum arabic and humectants such as glycerin, which together with other components, allow the color pigment to join and form the paint paste, which we know as watercolor. With regard to the colors, the quality of the pigments and their degree of concentration, it is what determines how good the watercolor is and also its price. A paint that has a high concentration of pigment, professional type, allows us to use it with a large amount of water without losing the intensity of color." Watercolors can also be made opaque by adding Chinese white. In the 19th century this could be controversial, and not regarded as "true watercolor" in the English tradition, but by about 1880 this dispute was over.

Watercolor paint is an ancient form of painting, if not the most ancient form of art itself. In East Asia, watercolor painting with inks is referred to as brush painting or scroll painting. In Chinese, Korean and Japanese painting it has been the dominant medium, often in monochrome black or browns, often using inkstick or other pigments. India, Ethiopia and other countries have long watercolor painting traditions as well.

As well as the growing importance of finished watercolors, especially in England from the later part of the 18th century, many Western artists used watercolor primarily as a sketching tool in preparation for the "finished" work in oil or engraving. Until the end of the eighteenth century, traditional watercolors were known as 'tinted drawings', and calling watercolor paintings "drawings" persisted until at least the 20th century in some quarters. The development of high quality color lithography by the end of the 19th century made possible attractive reproductive prints of watercolors, which have remained common, especially of landscape and still-life subjects.

== History ==
Watercolor art dates back to the cave paintings of Paleolithic Europe and has been used for manuscript illustration since at least Egyptian times, with particular prominence in the European Middle Ages. However, its continuous history as an art medium begins with the Renaissance. The German Northern Renaissance artist Albrecht Dürer (1471–1528), who painted several fine botanical, wildlife, and landscape watercolors, is generally considered among the earliest examples of watercolor. An important school of watercolor painting in Germany was led by Hans Bol (1534–1593) as part of the Dürer Renaissance.

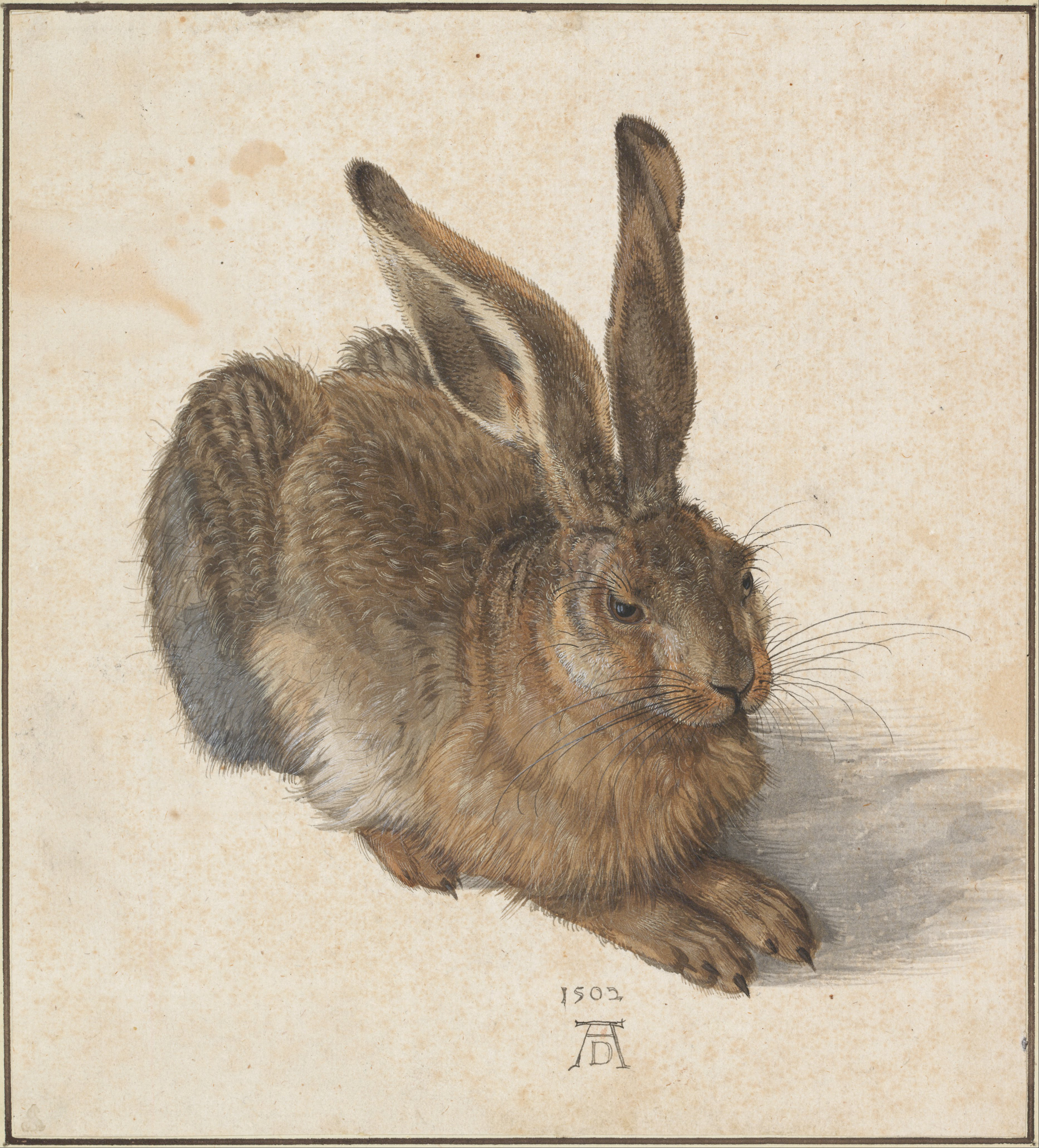
Albrecht Dürer, Young Hare, 1502, watercolor and body color, Albertina, Vienna

Despite this early start, watercolors were generally used by Baroque easel painters only for sketches, copies or cartoons (full-scale design drawings) Notable early practitioners of watercolor painting were Van Dyck (during his stay in England), Claude Lorrain, Giovanni Benedetto Castiglione, and many Dutch and Flemish artists. However, botanical illustration and wildlife illustration perhaps form the oldest and most important traditions in watercolor painting. Botanical illustrations became popular during the Renaissance, both as hand-tinted woodblock illustrations in books or broadsheets and as tinted ink drawings on vellum or paper. Botanical artists have traditionally been some of the most exacting and accomplished watercolor painters, and even today, watercolors—with their unique ability to summarize, clarify, and idealize in full color—are used to illustrate scientific and museum publications. Wildlife illustration reached its peak in the 19th century with artists such as John James Audubon, and today many naturalist field guides are still illustrated with watercolor paintings.

=== English school ===
Several factors contributed to the spread of watercolor painting during the 18th century, particularly in England. Among the elite and aristocratic classes, watercolor painting was one of the incidental adornments of a good education; mapmakers, military officers, and engineers valued it for its usefulness in depicting properties, terrain, fortifications, field geology, and for illustrating public works or commissioned projects. Watercolor artists were commonly taken on geological or archaeological expeditions, funded by the Society of Dilettanti (founded in 1733), to document discoveries in the Mediterranean, Asia, and the New World. These expeditions stimulated the demand for topographical painters, who churned out memento paintings of famous sites (and sights) along the Grand Tour to Italy that was undertaken by every fashionable young man of the time.

In the late 18th century, the English cleric William Gilpin wrote a series of hugely popular books describing his picturesque journeys throughout rural England, and illustrated them with self-made sentimentalized monochrome watercolors of river valleys, ancient castles, and abandoned churches. This example popularized watercolors as a form of personal tourist journal. The confluence of these cultural, engineering, scientific, tourist, and amateur interests culminated in the celebration and promotion of watercolor as a distinctly English "national art". William Blake published several books of hand-tinted engraved poetry, provided illustrations to Dante's Inferno, and he also experimented with large monotype works in watercolor. Among the many other significant watercolorists of this period were Thomas Gainsborough, John Robert Cozens, Francis Towne, Michael Angelo Rooker, William Pars, Thomas Hearne, and John Warwick Smith.

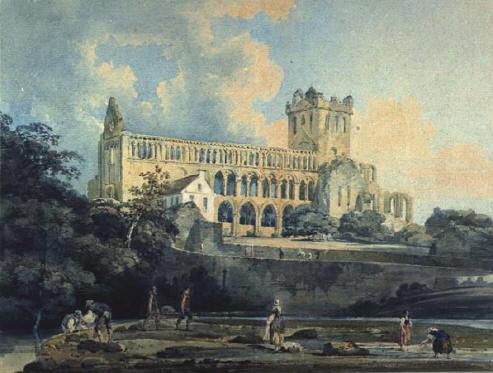
Thomas Girtin, Jedburgh Abbey from the River, 1798–99, watercolor on paper

From the late 18th century through the 19th century, the market for printed books and domestic art contributed substantially to the growth of the medium. Watercolors were used as the basic document from which collectible landscape or tourist engravings were developed, and hand-painted watercolor originals or copies of famous paintings contributed to many upper class art portfolios. Satirical broadsides by Thomas Rowlandson, many published by Rudolph Ackermann, were also extremely popular.

The three English artists credited with establishing watercolor as an independent, mature painting medium are Paul Sandby (1730–1809), often called the "father of the English watercolor"; Thomas Girtin (1775–1802), who pioneered its use for large format, romantic or picturesque landscape painting; and Joseph Mallord William Turner (1775–1851), who brought watercolor painting to the highest pitch of power and refinement, and created hundreds of superb historical, topographical, architectural, and mythological watercolor paintings. His method of developing the watercolor painting in stages, starting with large, vague color areas established on wet paper, then refining the image through a sequence of washes and glazes, permitted him to produce large numbers of paintings with "workshop efficiency" and made him a multimillionaire, partly by sales from his personal art gallery, the first of its kind. Among the important and highly talented contemporaries of Turner and Girtin were John Varley, John Sell Cotman, Anthony Copley Fielding, Samuel Palmer, William Havell, and Samuel Prout. The Swiss painter Abraham-Louis-Rodolphe Ducros was also widely known for his large format, romantic paintings in watercolor.

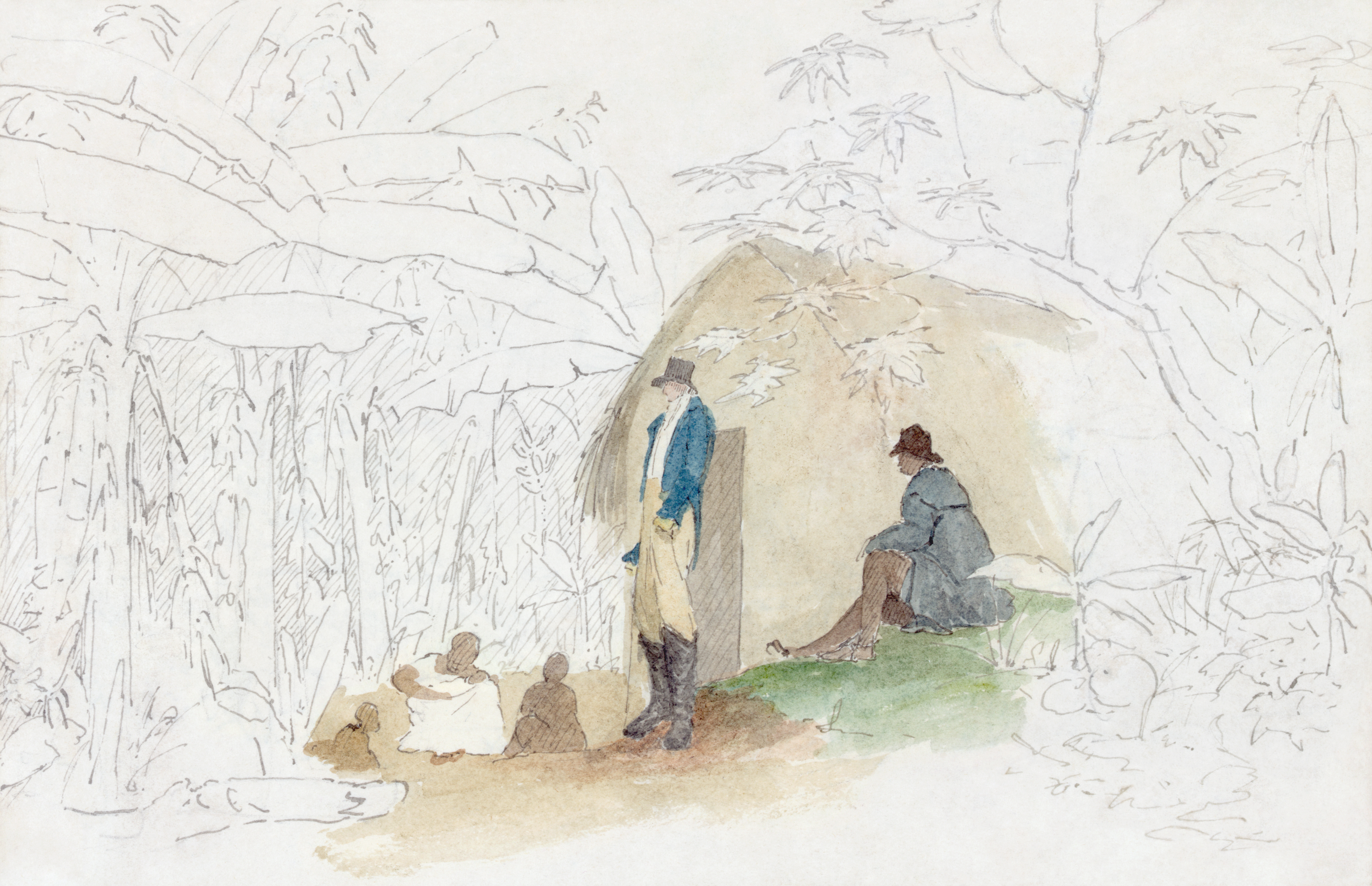
An unfinished watercolor by William Berryman, created between 1808 and 1816, using watercolor, ink, and pencil. The use of partial pigmentation draws attention to the central subject.

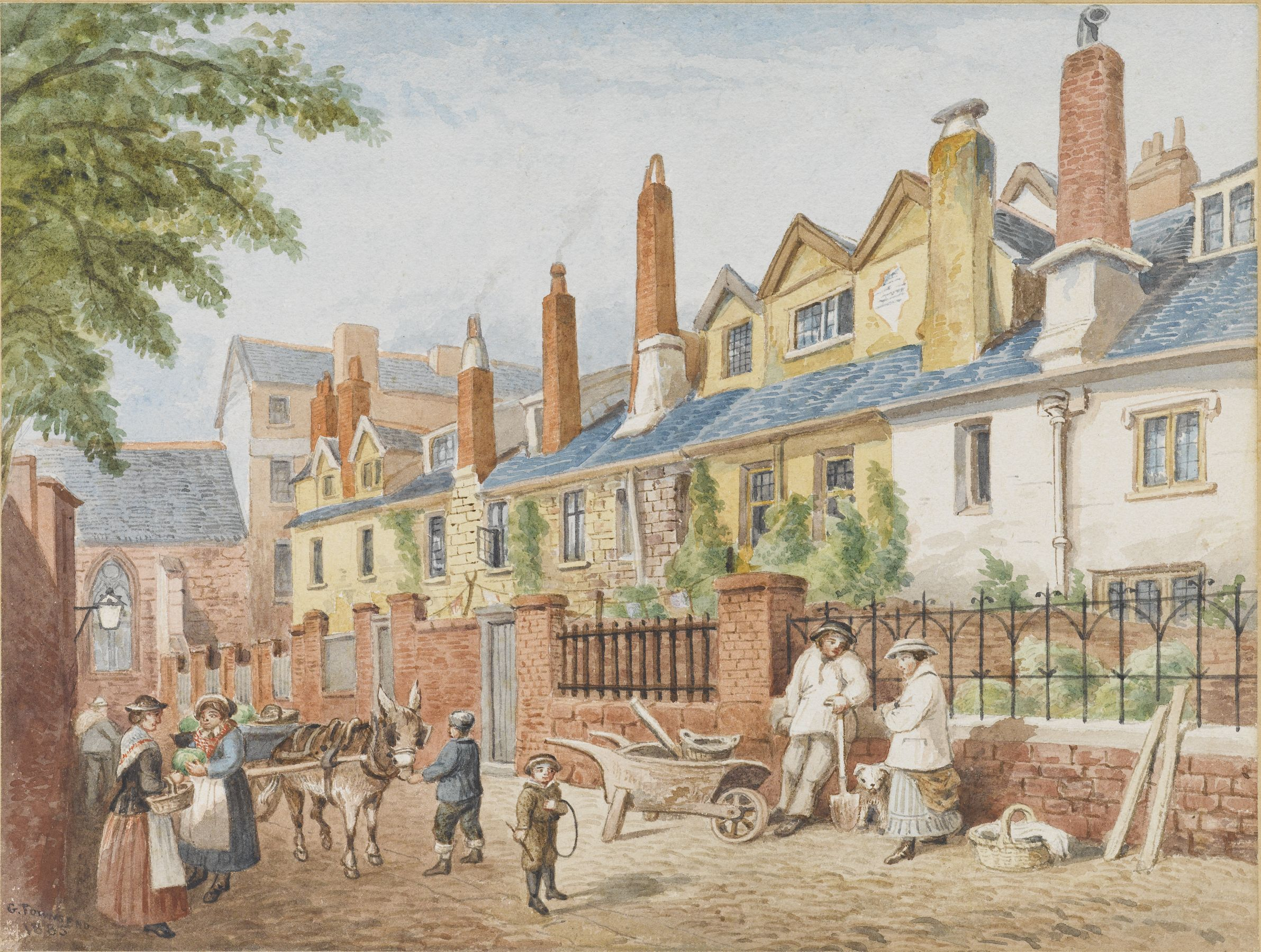
Remains of the Vicars' College, Exeter by George Townsend; 1885.

The confluence of amateur activity, publishing markets, middle class art collecting, and 19th-century technique led to the formation of English watercolor painting societies: the Society of Painters in Water Colours (1804, now known as the Royal Watercolour Society) and the New Water Colour Society (1832, now known as the Royal Institute of Painters in Water Colours). (A Scottish Society of Painters in Water Colour was founded in 1878, now known as the Royal Scottish Society of Painters in Watercolour.) These societies provided annual exhibitions and buyer referrals for many artists. They also engaged in petty status rivalries and aesthetic debates, particularly between advocates of traditional ("transparent") watercolor and the early adopters of the denser color possible with body color or gouache ("opaque" watercolor). The late Georgian and Victorian periods produced the zenith of the British watercolor, among the most impressive 19th-century works on paper, due to artists Turner, Varley, Cotman, David Cox, Peter de Wint William Henry Hunt, John Frederick Lewis, Myles Birket Foster, Frederick Walker, Thomas Collier, Arthur Melville and many others. In particular, the graceful, lapidary, and atmospheric watercolors ("genre paintings") by Richard Parkes Bonington created an international fad for watercolor painting, especially in England and France in the 1820s. In the latter half of the 19th century, portrait painter Frederick Havill became a key player in the establishment of watercolour in England. Art critic Huntly Carter described Havill as a "founder of the water colour school."

The popularity of watercolors stimulated many innovations, including heavier and more sized wove papers, and brushes (called "pencils") manufactured expressly for watercolor. Watercolor tutorials were first published in this period by Varley, Cox, and others, establishing the step-by-step painting instructions that still characterize the genre today; The Elements of Drawing, a watercolor tutorial by English art critic John Ruskin, has been out of print only once since it was first published in 1857. Commercial brands of watercolor were marketed and paints were packaged in metal tubes or as dry cakes that could be "rubbed out" (dissolved) in studio porcelain or used in portable metal paint boxes in the field. Breakthroughs in chemistry made many new pigments available, including synthetic ultramarine blue, cobalt blue, viridian, cobalt violet, cadmium yellow, aureolin (potassium cobaltinitrite), zinc white, and a wide range of carmine and madder lakes. These pigments, in turn, stimulated a greater use of color with all painting media, but in English watercolors, particularly by the Pre-Raphaelite Brotherhood.

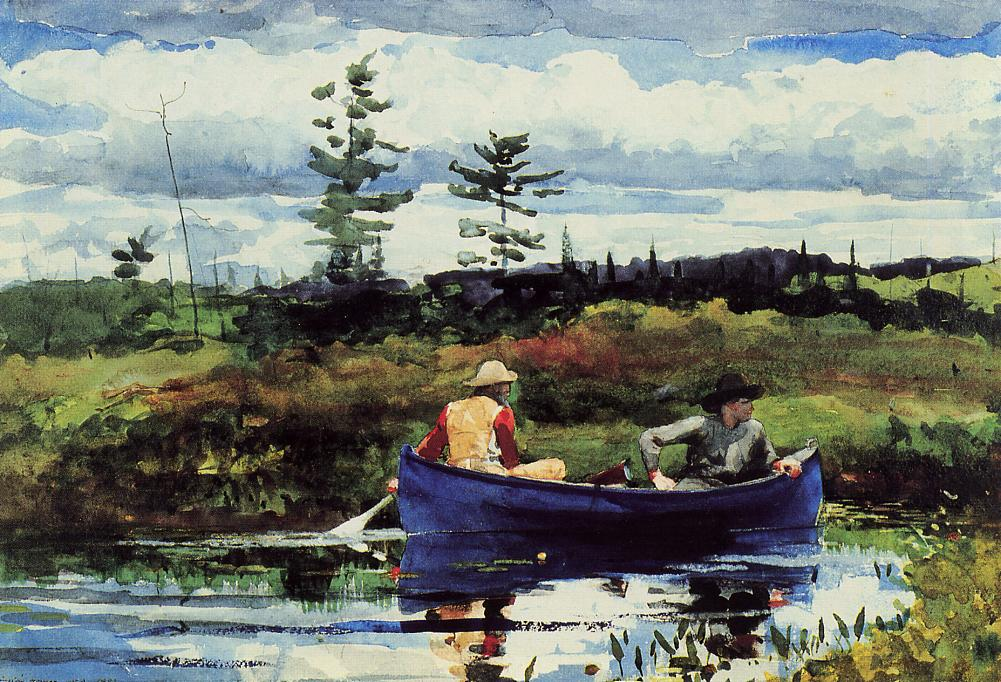
Winslow Homer, The Blue Boat, 1892

==== United States ====
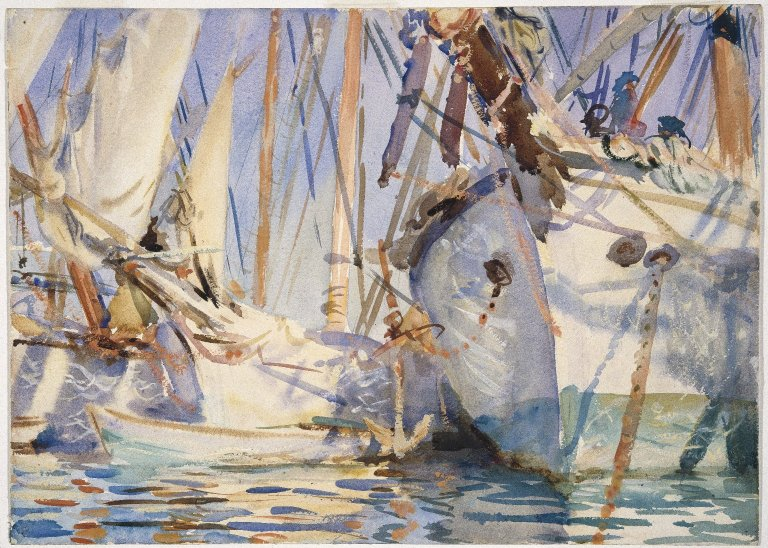
John Singer Sargent, White Ships. Brooklyn Museum

Watercolor painting also became popular in the United States during the 19th century; outstanding early practitioners included John James Audubon, as well as early Hudson River School painters such as William H. Bartlett and George Harvey. By mid-century, the influence of John Ruskin led to increasing interest in watercolors, particularly the use of a detailed "Ruskinian" style by such artists as John W. Hill Henry, William Trost Richards, Roderick Newman, and Fidelia Bridges. The American Society of Painters in Watercolor (now the American Watercolor Society) was founded in 1866. Late-19th-century American exponents of the medium included Thomas Moran, Thomas Eakins, John LaFarge, John Singer Sargent, Childe Hassam, and, preeminently, Winslow Homer.

=== Europe ===
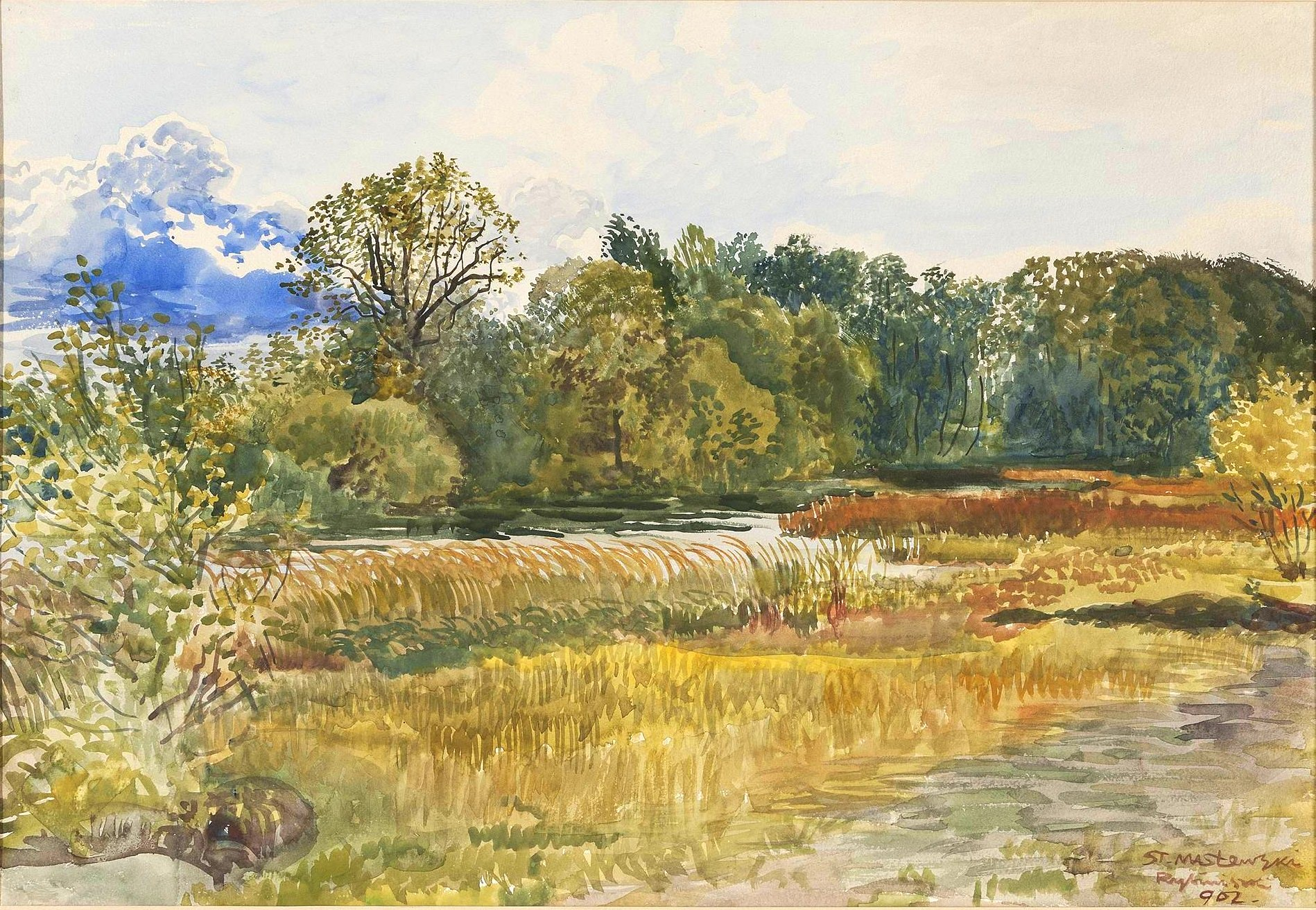
Stanisław Masłowski, Pejzaż jesienny z Rybiniszek (Autumn landscape of Rybiniszki), watercolor, 1902

Watercolor was less popular in Continental Europe. In the 18th century, gouache was an important medium for the Italian artists Marco Ricci and Francesco Zuccarelli, whose landscape paintings were widely collected. Gouache was used by a number of artists in France as well. In the 19th century, the influence of the English school helped popularize "transparent" watercolor in France, and it became an important medium for Eugène Delacroix, François Marius Granet, Henri-Joseph Harpignies, and the satirist Honoré Daumier. Other European painters who worked frequently in watercolor were Adolph Menzel in Germany and Stanisław Masłowski in Poland.

During the nineteenth century, watercolor was used to create detailed replicas of large scale oil paintings. One example is the watercolor version of Frederic Edwin Church's The Heart of the Andes, which scholars have actually identified as a copy rather than the original work. Analysis of the works materials and alterations shows the importance of watercolor during this period.

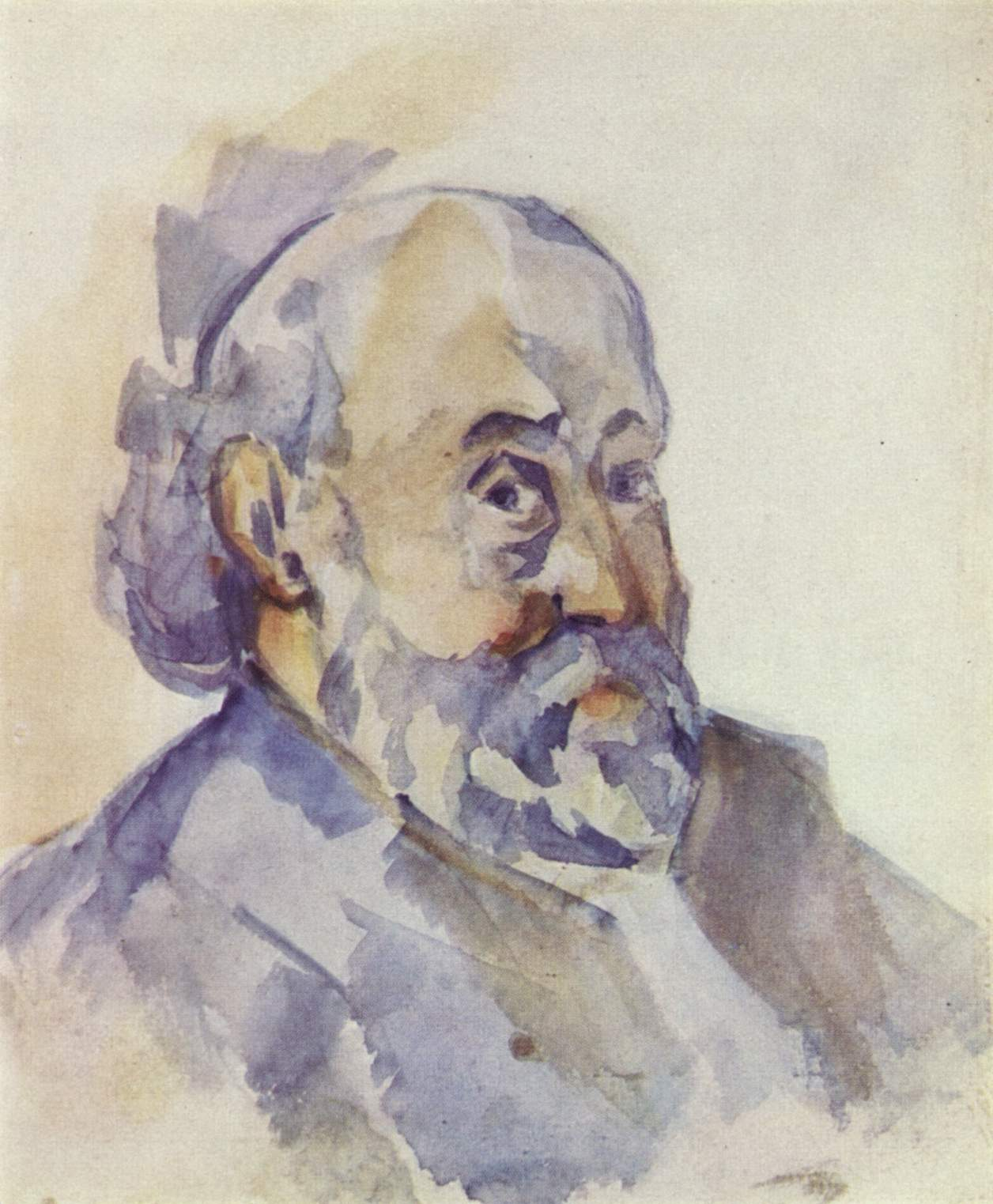
Paul Cézanne, self-portrait

The adoption of brightly colored, petroleum-derived aniline dyes (and pigments compounded from them), which all fade rapidly on exposure to light, and the efforts to properly conserve the twenty thousand J. M. W. Turner paintings inherited by the British Museum in 1857, led to a negative reevaluation of the permanence of pigments in watercolor. This caused a sharp decline in their status and market value. Nevertheless, isolated practitioners continued to prefer and develop the medium into the 20th century. Paul Signac created landscape and maritime watercolors, and Paul Cézanne developed a watercolor painting style consisting entirely of overlapping small glazes of pure color.

=== 20th and 21st centuries ===
Among the many 20th-century artists who produced important works in watercolor were Wassily Kandinsky, Emil Nolde, Paul Klee, Egon Schiele, and Raoul Dufy. In America, the major exponents included Charles Burchfield, Edward Hopper, Georgia O'Keeffe, Charles Demuth, and John Marin (80% of his total work is watercolor). In this period, American watercolor painting often emulated European Impressionism and Post-Impressionism, but significant individualism flourished in "regional" styles of watercolor painting from the 1920s to 1940s. In particular, the "Cleveland School" or "Ohio School" of painters centered around the Cleveland Museum of Art, and the California Scene painters were often associated with Hollywood animation studios or the Chouinard Art Institute (now California Institute of the Arts). The California painters exploited their state's varied geography, Mediterranean climate, and "automobility" to reinvigorate the outdoor or "plein air" tradition. The most influential among them were Phil Dike, Millard Sheets, Rex Brandt, Dong Kingman, and Milford Zornes. The California Water Color Society, founded in 1921 and later renamed the National Watercolor Society, sponsored important exhibitions of their work. The largest watercolor in the world at the moment (at 9 feet (3 m) tall and 16 ft (5 m) wide) is Building 6 Portrait: Interior. Produced by American artist Barbara Prey on commission for MASS MoCA, the work can be seen at MASS MoCA's Robert W. Wilson Building.

In France, several festivals dedicated to watercolor exist, such as the Brioude Watercolor Biennial, held in July, which brings together watercolorists of various nationalities every two years. Demonstrations and lectures are organized in the village of Brioude.

In America, although the rise of abstract expressionism, and the trivializing influence of amateur painters and advertising- or workshop-influenced painting styles, led to a temporary decline in the popularity of watercolor painting after c. 1950, watercolors continue to be utilized by artists like Martha Burchfield, Joseph Raffael, Andrew Wyeth, Philip Pearlstein, Eric Fischl, Gerhard Richter, Anselm Kiefer, and Francesco Clemente. In Spain, Ceferí Olivé created an innovative style followed by his students, such as Rafael Alonso López-Montero and Francesc Torné Gavaldà. In Mexico, the major exponents are Ignacio Barrios, Edgardo Coghlan, Ángel Mauro, Vicente Mendiola, and Pastor Velázquez. In the Canary Islands, where this pictorial technique has many followers, there are notable artists such as José Comas Quesada.

== Watercolor paint ==
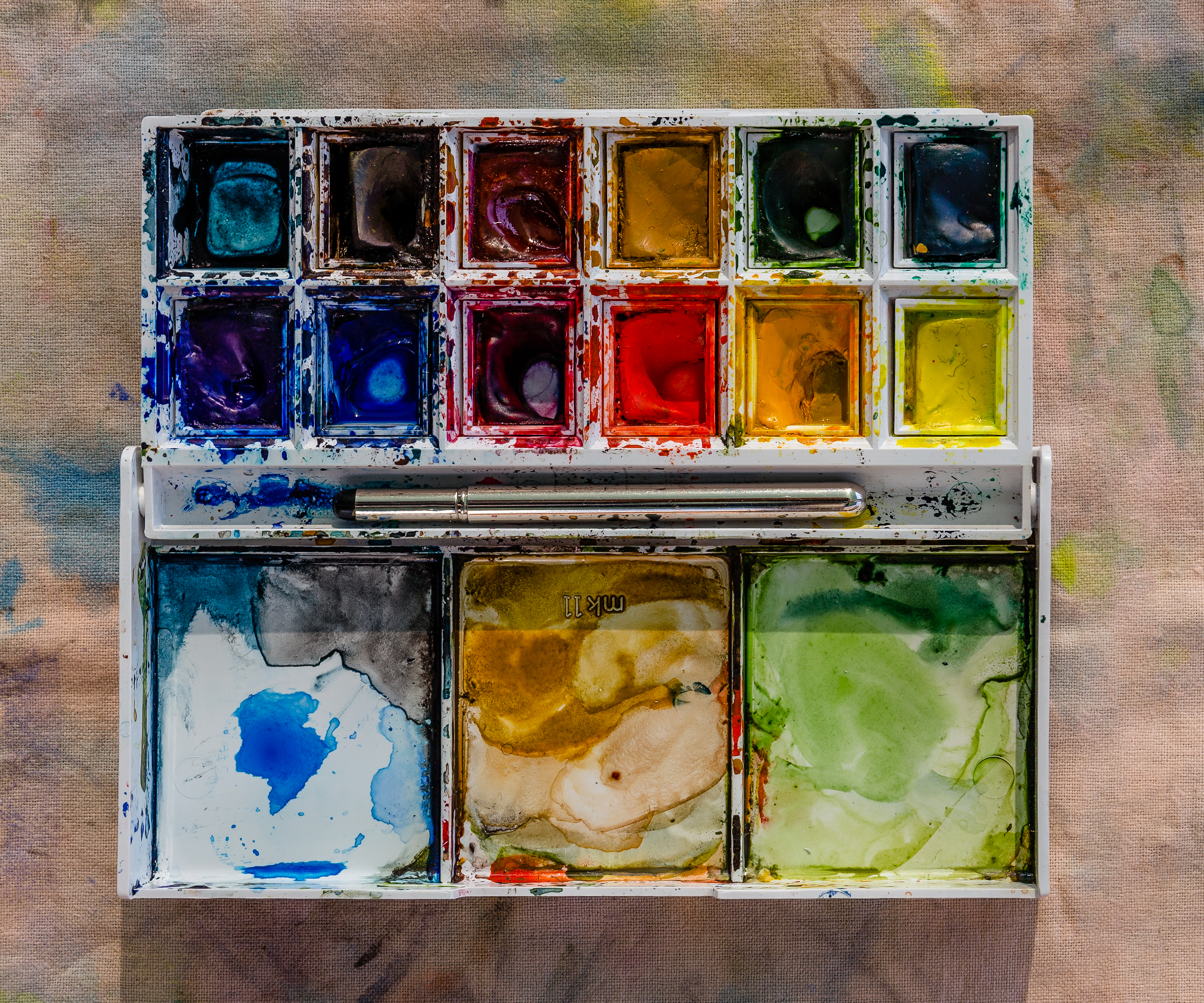
A set of watercolors, containing 12 dry pigment pans used by diluting and mixing colours in water.

Watercolor paint consists of four principal ingredients: a pigment; gum arabic as a binder to hold the pigment in suspension; additives like glycerin, ox gall, honey, and preservatives to alter the viscosity, hiding, durability or color of the pigment and vehicle mixture; and, evaporating water, as a solvent used to thin or dilute the paint for application.

The more general term watermedia refers to any painting medium that uses water as a solvent and that can be applied with a brush, pen, or sprayer. This includes most inks, watercolors, temperas, caseins, gouaches, and modern acrylic paints.

The term "watercolor" refers to paints that use water-soluble, complex carbohydrates as a binder. Originally (in the 16th to 18th centuries), watercolor binders were sugars and/or hide glues, but since the 19th century, the preferred binder is natural gum arabic, with glycerin and/or honey as additives to improve plasticity and solubility of the binder, and with other chemicals added to improve product shelf life.

The term "bodycolor" refers to paint that is opaque rather than transparent. It usually refers to opaque watercolor, known as gouache. Modern acrylic paints use an acrylic resin dispersion as a binder.

Paintings using water-soluble colored ink instead of modern watercolors are called aquarellum atramento (Latin for "aquarelle made with ink") by experts. However, this term has now tended to pass out of use.

Fluorescent watercolors are usually extremely sensitive to light exposure. Research shows that the materials in this type of watercolor can experience fading under exposure to daylight containing ultraviolet radiation. Studies show that removing ultraviolet wavelengths can slow the fading process, though changes in appearance may still occur depending on different lighting conditions.

Fluorescent watercolor paint's appearance is influenced by reflected light and fluorescent emission. Conservation studied have taught us that change in lighting conditions can completely alter the brightness and color of these paints. This reaction to certain light exposure can complicate how accurately these paints match colors during conservation.

Conservation research emphasizes the importance of measuring color change in watercolor materials over time. Studies that compare watercolor and plant based pigments use specific tools to measure and track fading and discoloration after light and heat exposure. These procedures help create a stronger understanding of how watercolor pigments change and take shape over time.

=== Commercial watercolors ===
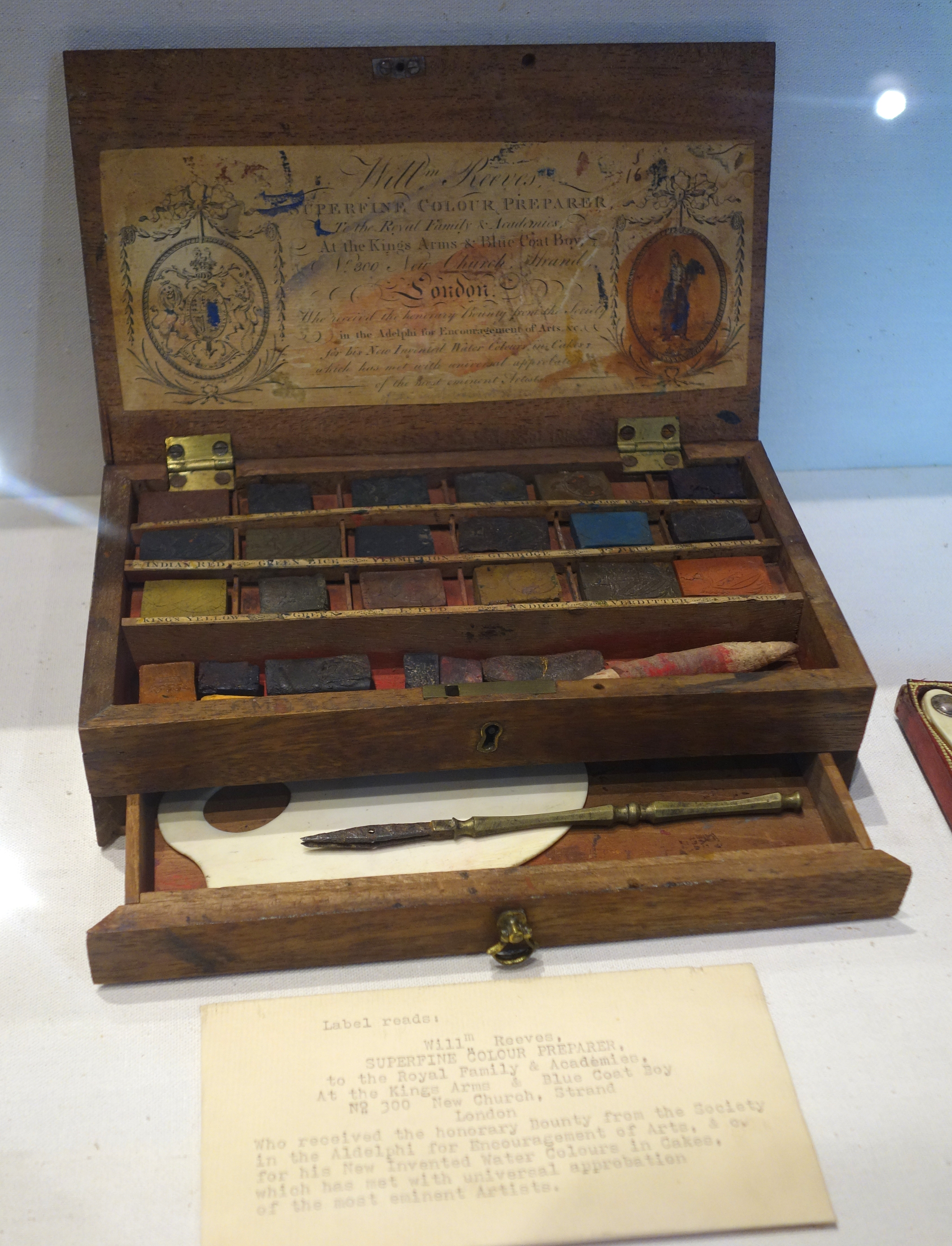
A Reeves watercolor box

Watercolor painters before the turn of the 18th century had to make paints themselves using pigments purchased from an apothecary or specialized "colorman", and mixing them with gum arabic or some other binder. The earliest commercial paints were small, resinous blocks that had to be wetted and laboriously "rubbed out" in water to obtain a usable color intensity. William Reeves started his business as a colorman around 1766. In 1781, he and his brother, Thomas Reeves, were awarded the Silver Palette of the Society of Arts, for the invention of the moist watercolor paint-cake, a time-saving convenience, introduced in the "golden age" of English watercolor painting. The "cake" was immediately soluble when touched by a wet brush.

Modern commercial watercolor paints are available in tubes, pans and liquids. The majority of paints sold today are in collapsible small metal tubes in standard sizes and formulated to a consistency similar to toothpaste by being already mixed with a certain water component. For use, this paste has to be further diluted with water. Pan paints (small dried cakes or bars of paint in an open plastic container) are usually sold in two sizes, full pans and half pans.

Owing to modern industrial organic chemistry, the variety, saturation, and permanence of artists' colors available today has been vastly improved. Correct and non-toxic primary colors are now present through the introduction of hansa yellow, phthalo blue and quinacridone. From such a set of three colors, in principle all others can be mixed, as in a classical technique no white is used. The modern development of pigments was not driven by artistic demand. The art materials industry is too small to exert any market leverage on global dye or pigment manufacture. With rare exceptions such as aureolin, all modern watercolor paints utilize pigments that have a wider industrial use. Paint manufacturers buy, by industrial standards very small, supplies of these pigments, mill them with the vehicle, solvent, and additives, and package them. The milling process with inorganic pigments, in more expensive brands, reduces the particle size to improve the color flow when the paint is applied with water.

=== Transparency ===
In the partisan debates of the 19th-century English art world, gouache was emphatically contrasted to traditional watercolors and denigrated for its high hiding power or lack of "transparency"; "transparent" watercolors were exalted. The aversion to opaque paint had its origin in the fact that well into the 19th century lead white was used to increase the covering quality. That pigment tended to soon discolor into black under the influence of sulphurous air pollution, totally ruining the artwork. The traditional claim that "transparent" watercolors gain "luminosity" because they function like a pane of stained glass laid on paper—the color intensified because the light passes through the pigment, reflects from the paper, and passes a second time through the pigment on its way to the viewer—is false. Watercolor paints typically do not form a cohesive paint layer, as do acrylic or oil paints, but simply scatter pigment particles randomly across the paper surface; the transparency is caused by the paper being visible between the particles. Watercolors may appear more vivid than acrylics or oils because the pigments are laid down in a purer form, with few or no fillers (such as kaolin) obscuring the pigment colors. Typically, most or all of the gum binder will be absorbed by the paper, preventing the binder from changing the visibility of the pigment. The gum being absorbed does not decrease but increase the adhesion of the pigment to the paper, as its particles will then penetrate the fibers more easily. In fact, an important function of the gum is to facilitate the "lifting" (removal) of color, should the artist want to create a lighter spot in a painted area. Furthermore, the gum prevents flocculation of the pigment particles.

== Techniques ==
Watercolor painting employs a range of techniques that take advantage of the medium’s transparency, fluidity, and interaction with water and paper. These techniques influence the appearance, texture, and depth of a finished work.

One of the most common approaches is the wash, in which diluted pigment is applied evenly across the paper. Washes may be flat, producing a uniform color, or graded, transitioning gradually from darker to lighter tones. Washes are often used to establish backgrounds, skies, or large areas of color.

Artists frequently distinguish between wet-on-wet and wet-on-dry techniques. In wet-on-wet painting, pigment is picked on a wet brush and applied to damp or wet paper, allowing colors to spread and blend softly, as well as lighten an intense color. This technique is often associated with atmospheric effects and loose forms. Wet-on-dry painting involves applying pigment to dry paper, resulting in sharper edges and greater control, which is useful for detailed areas. Painting with this technique dries darker than the wet-on-wet technique due to amount of water on the brush and the pigment.

Layering, also known as glazing, is another fundamental technique. Transparent layers of color are applied over dried paint to build depth, modify hues, or create shadows. Because watercolor is transparent, underlying layers remain visible and contribute to the final color effect.

Additional techniques are used to create texture and visual interest. Dry brush involves using a brush with minimal water to produce rough, broken marks that emphasize the texture of the paper. This technique is often use to create a textured look such as waves, grass or texture on tree trunks. Lifting removes pigment from damp or dry paper using a brush, sponge, or cloth to create highlights or corrections though some colors have more staining qualities than others which may prevent complete lifting of the pigment. Artists may also employ masking, in which areas are temporarily covered to preserve the white of the paper while surrounding areas are painted. This technique can be used for negative paintings where artists cover the parts with masking fluid and paint around the object making the covered object pop up in the painting.

To create different textures, artists sometimes use pantry staples like kosher salt. In this technique salt is sprinkled on painting while it is still wet but not too wet that melts the salt. The salt repels the pigments while absorbing some of the water creating blooming effects. This is particularly used in snowy scenes with a dark background. Finer salt can result in smaller blooms.

During conservation and restoration, materials used to tone or repair watercolor are meticulously selected for color stability. Scientific studies in paper conservation show that plant-based dyes that are applied to Japanese tissue papers experience a greater color change compared to modern watercolor. Because of this, artists normally use commercial pigments when repairing paintings that are meant to be visually stable over a long period of time.

Research in paper conservation has also investigated how different kinds of coloring materials interact with traditional materials used in watercolor restoration. There are studies that compare natural plant dyes to synthetic watercolor pigments, and they have found that plant-derived pigments show lower resistance to heat and humidity. This shows the risk of using natural dyes in watercolor works.

== See also ==
- Acrylic painting techniques
- History of painting
- Ink wash painting
- Oil painting
- Category:Watercolorists
