= Aldrin (disambiguation) =

Aldrin is a pesticide.

Aldrin may also refer to:

== Astronomy ==
- 6470 Aldrin, an asteroid
- Aldrin (crater), a lunar crater
- Aldrin cycler, a spacecraft trajectory

== People ==
- Aldrin Davis (born 1969), known as DJ Toomp, American producer and musician
- Anders G. Aldrin (1889–1970), American artist
- Anil Alexander Aldrin (born 1971), Indian hockey player
- Buzz Aldrin (born 1930), American astronaut
- Edwin Eugene Aldrin Sr. (1896–1974), American military officer
- Jeswin Aldrin (born 2001), Indian long jumper
- Julian Aldrin Pasha (born 1969), Indonesian politician

== Other ==
- Lily Aldrin, a fictional character in How I Met Your Mother
- Aldrin Pesky, character in The Buzz on Maggie
