= Rex Brandt =

American artist and educator (1914–2000)

Rexford Elson Brandt (August 12, 1914 – March 21, 2000) was an American artist and educator. Much of his oeuvre consists of paintings inspired by the life and geography of the West Coast of the United States, particularly California. Brandt worked in multiple mediums including print making, oil painting and watercolor painting. He gained national recognition for his watercolor painting during the period from the mid-1930s to the 1990s. Early in his career he was associated with California Scene Painting but after World War II Brandt focused on complex, semi-abstract works. The depiction of the regenerative warmth of the sun was a central focus of his painting; he wrote that "Everyone has hang-ups, I suppose. Mine is sunshine. Not sunlight – although I like to paint sunlight too."

Brandt was an influential educator through his many years of teaching and publishing. He taught at numerous educational institutions including Riverside Junior College and the Chouinard Art Institute. Along with the painter Phil Dike, he opened the Brandt-Dike Summer School of Painting in 1947 at his home in Corona del Mar where he continued to teach summer classes for thirty-eight years. He published his first book of watercolor instruction in 1948 and continued to write and publish throughout his life. In 1993 he was awarded an American Artist Achievement Award for his teaching.

== Life ==
Rex Brandt was born in 1914 in San Diego, California to Alfred O. Brandt, a Swedish immigrant, and Ellen Dale Woodward. His family later moved to Los Angeles and then Riverside, California where he graduated from high school. While still in high school he took art classes at the Chouinard School of Art. He attended Riverside Junior College and went on to get his bachelor's degree at the University of California, Berkeley in 1936. While at Berkeley he was exposed to the ideas of Hans Hoffman, who had recently taught there. He studied Chinese landscape painting, Byzantine art, and the modernist painters Cézanne, Picasso, and Matisse.

Brandt returned to Riverside Junior College as a professor of art in 1937. Also in that year, he helped organize an exhibition of forty-five paintings by artists, many of whom are associated with California Scene Painting. Among the artists represented were Brandt, Millard Sheets, Barse Miller, Phil Dike, Milford Zornes, and George Post.

In March 1938, Brandt married the sculptor and painter Joan Irving, whom he had met at Riverside Junior College. In 1943, Brandt, having left Riverside Junior College, moved with his young family to Corona del Mar, just south of Newport Beach, where they had purchased property. He named his property "Blue Sky" and it was there he lived and worked throughout the rest of his life. He opened a summer painting school at "Blue Sky" in 1947 and the school remained in operation through 1985 when it closed due to increasing urbanization. Brandt also expanded his sources of income beyond painting and teaching; he worked as a designer for West Coast Ship Building and formed his own commercial and residential design firm, Rex Brandt Associates. Brandt was active in the civic life of the Newport Beach area; he was one of the original members of the Parks, Beaches and Recreation Commission of Newport Beach, he designed the city's official seal, and helped plan the state beach at Corona Del Mar.

Brandt also spent considerable time in the San Juan Islands. He purchased property on Orcas Island in 1964. Then in 1966 Brandt and his wife built a second home on Shaw Island where they typically spent a few months a year. During his time in the San Juans, Brandt reestablished his print making practice, he wrote: "I've turned again to an early love of block cutting because its power and simplicity express the way I feel about the San Juan Islands."

He died at his home in Corona del Mar at the age of 85. Retrospective exhibitions have been mounted by the Newport Harbor Nautical Museum (2000) and the Laguna Art Museum (2014).

== Selected awards and affiliations ==
- First in Watercolor for Bay Breeze, California State Fair, 1934.
- First in Prints for Building the Bridges, Los Angeles County Fair, 1936.
- Director, Riverside Junior College Art Center, 1938–1943.
- Vice-president, California Watercolor Society, 1947.
- President, California Watercolor Society, 1949.
- American Artist Special Citation for The Brothers Light, American Water Color Society Annual Exhibition, 1952.
- Associate Academician, National Academy of Design, 1955.
- Brugger Award for Going to the Race, California Water Color Society Exhibition, 1956
- Vice President, American Watercolor Society, 1965–1969
- Samuel F. B. Morse medal for the painting Morning: Rocky Point, National Academy of Design, 1968.
- Lily Saportas Award for the painting Morning: Rocky Point, American Watercolor Society, 1968.
- Life Fellow, Royal Society of the Arts, 1972.
- Full Academician, National Academy of Design, 1974.
- Dolphin Fellow, American Watercolor Society, 1981.
- Teacher Achievement Award for Watercolor, American Artist, 1993.
- Helena Modjeska Cultural Legacy Award, Orange County Arts Awards, 2000 (posthumous).

== Bibliography ==
=== Books authored by Brandt ===
- Watercolor with Rex Brandt. Corona del Mar, CA: Self Published. 1948. Instructional handbook for watercolor painters based on Brandt's teaching at the Chouinard Art Institute and at the Brandt-Dike Summer School. Similar in content to his Watercolor Technique in 15 Lessons.
- The Composition of Landscape Painting. Corana del Mar, CA: Self Published. 1959. Subtitled: "The dynamic integration of graphic elements from land and sea for expression". A similar, softbound edition was self published by Brandt entitled Notes on the Composition of Landscape Painting.
- Watercolor Technique in 15 Lessons (6th rev. ed.). New York: Rienhold Book Corporation. 1963. Watercolor instruction, also includes an essay on painting entitled "Watercolor – A Way Of Seeing". Several other editions of the book were published.
- Watercolor Landscape. New York: Reinhold Pub. Corp. 1963. Beside its instructional chapters on watercolor painting, the book includes a chapter on the historical background of watercolor painting. In addition to Brandt's own work, the book features work from other artists including Millard Sheets, Barse Miller, Phil Dike and George Post.
- The Artist's Sketchbook and Its Uses. New York: Reinhold Pub. Corp. 1966.
- Rex Brandt's San Diego: Land of the Sundown Sea. Palm Desert, CA: Best-West Publications. 1969. A tribute to the city where he was born; paintings and drawings made by the artist over several months of travel in and around San Diego.
- The Winning Ways of Watercolor. New York: Van Nostrand Reinhold Co. 1973. Subtitled: "Basic techniques and methods of transparent watercolor in twenty lessons". Watercolor painting instruction. Also published in paperback.
- Watercolor Techniques and Methods: The Twenty Basic Lessons adapted from the winning ways of watercolor for easy student and studio use. New York: Van Nostrand Reinhold Co. 1977.
- West Coast Sketchbook. Corona del Mar, CA: Self Published. 1978.
- Seeing with a Painter's Eye (2nd ed.). New York: Van Nostrand Reinhold. 1984. Originally self published 1981, several later editions also published. Subtitled: "Notes on the composition of paintings from the Brandt Painting Workshops". An analysis of the fundamental facets of painting including psychology of the artist, line, value, color, and composition.
- About Landscape: Selected Statements. Corona del Mar, Calif.: Self Published. 1989.

=== Books featuring Brandt's work ===
- Muller, Jerome K., ed. (1972). Rex Brandt: A Portfolio of Recent Works Commemorating the First 25 Years of the Brandt Workshop At Corona del Mar. Santa Ana, CA: Unicorn Press.
- Blake, Janet (2014). Rex Brandt: In Praise of Sunshine. Laguna Beach, CA: Laguna Art Museum. Published in conjunction with a retrospective exhibit of Brandt's work. Includes numerous reproductions of Brandt's work as well as a biography, chronology, list of classes taught by Brandt, and a list of publications by Brandt.

=== Books including Brandt's work ===
- Kent, Norman (1956). Seascapes and Landscapes in Watercolor. New York: Watson-Guptill Publications.
- Watson, Ernest William (1959). Composition in Landscape and Still Life. Watson-Guptill Publications. Republished 2007 by Dover Publications.
- Brommer, Gerald F. (1973). Transparent Watercolor; ideas and techniques. Worcester, Mass.: Davis Publications. ISBN 9780871920546.
- Betts, Edward (1975). Master Class in Watercolor. New York: Watson-Guptill.
- Shackelford, Bud (1980). Experimental Watercolor Techniques. New York: Watson-Guptill Publications. ISBN 9780823016198.
- Griffith, Thomas (1981). A Practical Guide for Beginning Painters. Englewood Cliffs, N.J.: Prentice-Hall.
- McClelland, Gordon. (1985). The California style : California watercolor artists, 1925–1955. Last, Jay T. Beverly Hills, CA: Hillcrest Press.
- Westphal, Ruth Lilly (1991). American scene painting : California, 1930s and 1940s. Dominik, Janet B. Irvine, Calif.: Westphal Pub.
