= California Scene Painting =

American regionalist art movement

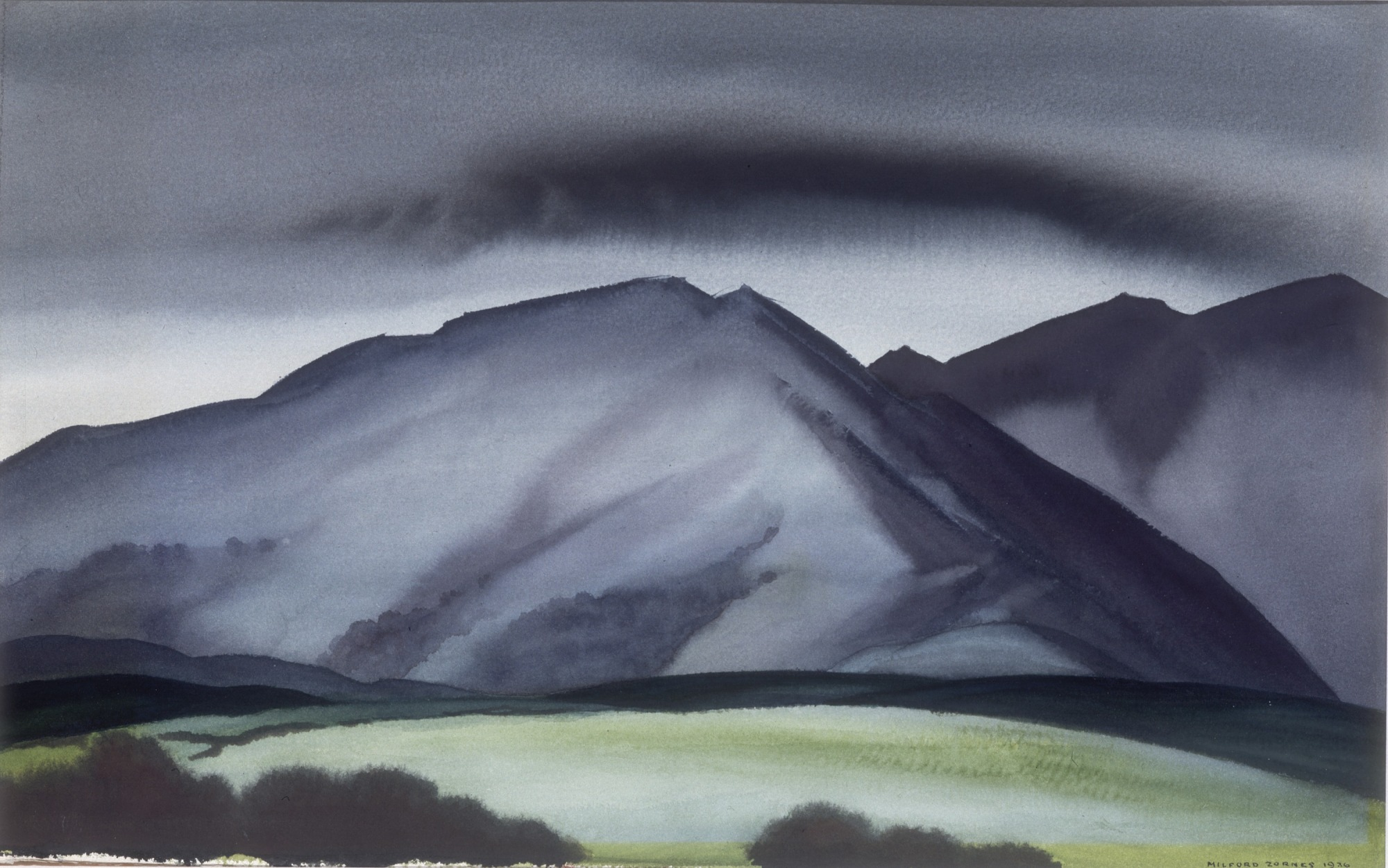
Milford Zornes, San Fernando Mountains, 1936, watercolor on paper, 15 3/8 x 22 5/8 in.

California Scene Painting, also known as Southern California Regionalism, is a form of American regionalist art depicting landscapes, places, and people of California. It flourished from the 1920s to the 1960s.

== History ==
Early 20th century California artists interested in everyday images and themes from the state's 19th century history provided the foundation for the emergence of the regional genre of California Scene Painting. The term was attributed to Los Angeles art critic Arthur Millier, and it referred to watercolors, oil paintings and mosaics of landscapes and scenes of everyday life, such as mountain and coastal scenery, pastoral agricultural valleys, and dynamic cities and highways.

Varying in style and subject, California Scene Painting was influenced by a range of precursor styles, notably Impressionism (particularly California Impressionism), Cubism, and Realism.

California artists impacted the American Scene movement by contributing paintings that reflect their state's unique subject matter and made advances in watercolor technique. The majority of California Scene paintings were done in watercolor. In the late 1920s some California painters, who studied at the Chouinard Art Institute, began working in what would be known as the California Style distinguished by large size paper, strong vibrant colors, vigorous bold and broad brushwork. At the time most artists working in watercolor used it as a sketching medium or to color pencil drawings. California Scene artists used watercolor as a painting medium, painted wet-on-wet and in larger formats. Watercolor allowed for opportunistic and spontaneous painting of scenes done on location reflecting California life.

== Subject matter ==
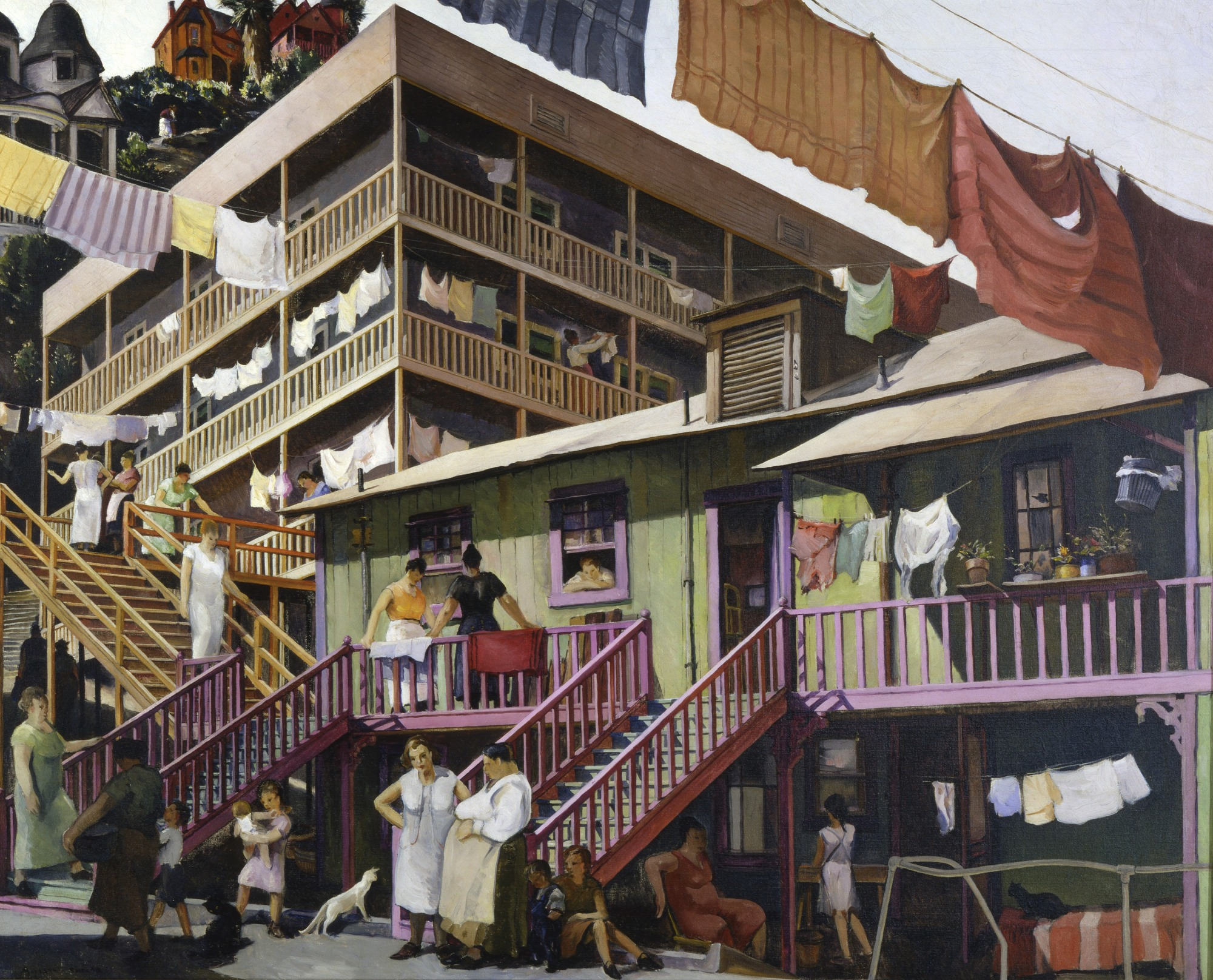
Millard Sheets,Tenement Flats, 1933–1934. Oil on canvas, 40 1/4 x 50 1/4 in. (102.1 x 127.6 cm.)

Figurative California Scene paintings documented the life of the average American and their hard work, both manual labor and domestic housework. Landscape paintings showed California's scenic beauty, its beaches, deserts, mountains and rolling farmlands. Landscapes focusing on farms and farmers were a testament to hard work and resilience. In the 1930s California was primarily agricultural and farms were considered the backbone of the American economy. Artists painted subjects of California coastal life, scenes around San Francisco Bay, Monterey's fishing industry and cliffs along the southern coastline. Yacht harbors, fishing boats, beach life, stevedores and San Diego Navy men were included. Cityscapes of Los Angeles showed street scenes, panoramic views, tenements and buildings. San Francisco painters depicted views of the peninsula with the bridges and Alcatraz, scenes along the docks and houses on hillsides. California Scene paintings portray everyday life tracing California's physical, social and cultural evolution from the Great Depression and World War II to the post-War era of accelerated development.

== Notable artists ==
Notable California Scene painters included Emil Kosa Jr., Roger Edward Kuntz, Millard Sheets, Milford Zornes, Phil Dike, Rex Brandt, Phil Paradise, Elsie Palmer Payne, George Post, Elsie Lower Pomeroy, Barse Miller, Paul Sample, Dong Kingman, Anders Aldrin, and Charles Payzant. One group — including Sheets, Dike, Brandt, Miller, Zornes, and Kosa Jr. — worked in large-scale watercolors.

== See also ==
- California Impressionism
