= Anders G. Aldrin =

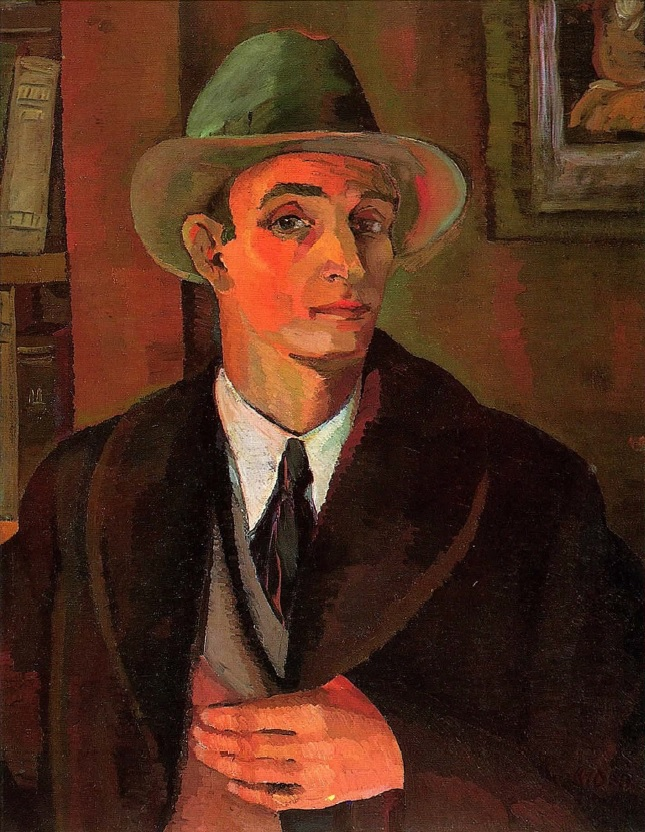
- Aldrin, 1928 self-portrait
- Born: 29 August 1889; Stjärnsfors, Värmland, Sweden
- Died: 24 February 1970 (aged 80); Sylmar, California, U.S.
- Education: Otis Art Institute; Santa Barbara School of the Arts
- Known for: Painting: California landscapes and portraiture; water colors; wood block prints

Anders Gustaf Aldrin (1889–1970) was a Swedish born American artist, active from 1926 to 1970. The majority of his work was in painting, watercolors and wood block prints. He emigrated to the United States in 1911. In 1918, he joined the United States Army and served in France, becoming a naturalized citizen. After recovering from tuberculosis in Arizona, he entered Otis Art Institute in 1923. Influenced by turn-of-the-century European masters such as Picasso, Marc, and Kandinsky, his landscapes, portraits and still lifes were rendered with broad, quick strokes and intense hues. Respected by critics and artists alike, he chose an independent path for his work not wanting to be tied to a style or movement. But he can easily be placed as a member of the California Scene Painting artists, as he preferred to work out in nature. His work can be found in a number of museums.

== Early life ==
Born on August 29, 1889, in Stjernsfors Bruk Uddeholm, Sweden. He was born with an artistic temperament and the relentless drive of a creative person. He also was burdened with working in a paper mill from the early age of ten, helping to support the family. He wrote in his journal: “I was very unhappy in my work in the mills as I had ambition to go to school and learn, was hungry for knowledge, if only a good trade.”

In 1910, he registered for compulsory military service, hoping thereby to leave his work in the mills. To his great disappointment he was rejected as being physically unfit for service. He then made the decision to emigrate to America, and left Sweden, sailing on the steamship Mauretania. He arrived at Ellis Island on July 28, 1911, and went directly to Chicago where he had a brother and some friends. His labors carried him to neighboring states and finally to Minneapolis, Minnesota where he met and married Mabel Esther Lindberg, daughter of a Swedish Baptist minister.

Aldrin received his naturalization papers when he was drafted into the United States Army in World War I. He went to France as a private in the 604th Engineers and received a citation in the Meuse-Argonne offensive. After a year in France he came back to the United States to convalesce in the Veterans TB Hospital, Prescott, Arizona. After two years of hospital life he moved his family to Los Angeles, California where he started his formal art education.

== Art Education ==
A modest army pension allowed him to support his small family while attending Otis Art Institute for four years (1923-1927). While there, he studied under Edouard Vysekal, who became a close friend. In 1925 his design for the cover for the catalog for the Pan-American Exposition (assembled by the Los Angeles Museum of History, Science and Art) was chosen from all the submittals.

Aldrin was awarded a full scholarship for his last year, which was announced in the Department of Fine and Applied Arts. The announcement described him as "one of the best trained and most promising students . . . Mr. Aldrin's splendid unconditioned attitude will continue to achieve, both physically and spiritually."

After finishing at Otis, Aldrin moved to Santa Barbara where he attended the Santa Barbara School of the Arts on a full scholarship from 1927 to 1930. While there he studied under Frank Morley Fletcher, who taught the Japanese Ukiyo-e method of making woodblock prints, which he would pursue in the 1930s production of 14 different designs. Aldrin was one of the earliest Americans to develop the print technique and was asked to teach in Paris but turned the opportunity down to continue in his own studies and education. In Santa Barbara he was commissioned to make bronze title plates for many public buildings, and he had several commissions for oil portraits. Alden Freeman commissioned him to carve copies of St. Francis and St. Dominique altar pieces in the Santa Barbara Mission.

He further supplemented his education with six months at the San Francisco Art Institute. (Summer and Fall of 1929). Six months later the family returned to Los Angeles where Aldrin began his painting in earnest.

== Career ==
Anders Aldrin at an Oregon stream 1938

Aldrin liked to paint directly from nature, often with his artist friend John Dominique, traveling up and down California, Oregon and Washington. The mediums he worked in were oil paintings, watercolors, pastels, wood block prints, and pen and ink drawings. His subject matter included landscapes and seascapes, figure works, portraits, and still lifes, especially florals. In 1932 he designed the cover of the program for the Los Angeles Olympics.

He was a member of the Los Angeles Art Association, the Scandinavian American Art Society of the West, and of the California Water Color Society, in which he was a regular exhibitor beginning in 1927 and continuing through the 1960s.

He began exhibiting locally, starting with a one man show at the West Hollywood Art Gallery in 1930, and again in 1941. Other shows followed. He had a one-man show at the Los Angeles County Museum of Art in 1935, and again in 1941.

In 1940 his painting Echo Park became the subject of Arthur Millier's "The Art Thrill of the Week," when it was exhibited at the 20th Annual California Water Color Society exhibition. Not garnering any award, it nevertheless caught Millier's attention as "the most profound, perhaps the only profound, job of painting in this best show the society has ever put on.

In November 1940 Scripps College in Claremont held a one-person exhibition of his work, which included oil paintings, watercolors, pastels, and prints. Artist and educator Millard Sheets selected the works and wrote the foreword to the catalogue. Many other one-man shows followed, notably the Otis Art Institute in 1941, the Jake Zeitlin Gallery in 1942, the Santa Barbara Museum in 1943, and the Vysekal Studio Gallery in 1947.

In 1951-52 Aldrin returned to Sweden for the first time since his departure. This trip, which was tantamount to renewing his Swedish roots, was spiritually important to Aldrin. He traveled extensively and produced many paintings. He had a one-man show in Karlstad and had success in selling his works while there.

Back in California, he had entries in the National Orange Show in San Bernardino 3 years in a row, winning the Purchase Prize in 1956 and an Honorable Mention in 1955.

In 1957 he traveled to Japan where his daughter was living and traveled extensively, including to Sado Island.

Pacific Ocean Park held a retrospective exhibit in 1961, and also in that year he won the Purchase Prize at the California State Fair. He continued to have one-man shows through the late 50's and 60's. In 1962 he returned to visit Sweden and traveled to St. Petersburg in Russia.

Aldrin kept up a busy exhibition schedule. His works were exhibited with the California Watercolor Society, the Los Angeles Art Association, and the Scandinavian-American Art Society as well as the Foundation of Western Art, the Chaffey Community Art Association, and the National Orange Show.

Sometime before January 1967 Aldrin was admitted to the Veterans Hospital in Sylmar with a recurrence of tuberculosis. While in the hospital, Aldrin's life changed little. He wrote to friends, kept a diary, read and continued his art, beginning to work with the new medium of acrylics. Near the end of his life, his diary reveals his satisfaction at mastering the new medium.

Although Aldrin was still in frail condition, the doctors allowed his release. He had time to make a last trip to Sweden (in 1969) with his niece before he began to experience strokes. His family readmitted him to the Veterans Hospital in Sylmar. He died there on February 24, 1970.
