= Emil Kosa Jr. =

French-American special effects artist

- Born: November 28, 1903; Paris, France
- Died: November 4, 1968 (aged 64); Los Angeles, California
- Occupations: Visual effects artist; painter
- Years active: 1958–1969 (last film released after his death)

Emil Kosa Jr. (November 28, 1903 – November 4, 1968) was an American artist of Czech origin. He was the art director of 20th Century Pictures' special effects department for more than three decades, winning an Academy Award for Best Visual Effects along the way. As a painter of landscapes and urban scenes, he also became known as a prominent member of the California Scene Painting movement.

== Family and education ==
Emil Kosa Jr. was born in Paris, France. His parents were Emil Kosa Sr., Czech artist, and Jeanne Mares Kosa, a French pianist for the Paris Opera. After his mother died at the age of three, the family moved to Bohemia and his father married a Czech wife. In 1908, the family moved temporarily to Cape Cod, Massachusetts, where his father worked with Alphonse Mucha. Four years later, the family returned to Bohemia where he attended the primary and secondary school during and after the World War I.

After World War I ended, Kosa Jr. trained in art at the Academy of Fine Arts, Prague. After a mere three semesters, he moved to the United States in January 1921, rejoining his family (which had preceded him in emigrating to the United States). He took art courses at the California Institute of the Arts in Valencia.

In 1927, he became a naturalized American citizen. He spent the following year in Paris, studying at the École des Beaux Arts and with Pierre Laurens and Frank Kupka, and returned to California in 1928.

== Career ==
Kosa is credited with designing the logo for 20th Century Fox, this is the first on-screen logo from 1935.

Early in his career, Kosa Jr. worked as a mural painter and designer for various architects and interior decoration firms. He also ran a business with his father producing decorative art objects for churches and auditoriums.

As a painter, Kosa Jr. was stylistically affiliated with the movement that became known as California Scene Painting. He painted mainly California landscapes and urban settings in both oil and watercolor, and he also produced commissioned portraits of celebrities, businessmen, and politicians. His work was widely exhibited starting in the 1930s, with solo shows at the Los Angeles County Museum of Art and elsewhere.

In 1933, he joined the newly formed special effects department at 20th Century Fox (later 20th Century Studios). He was quickly promoted to art director, a position he held for the next 35 years. In 1964, he became the first person to win the Best Visual Effects after the Academy Awards changed the name from Special Effects. He won at the 36th Academy Awards for his work on the film Cleopatra.

He also helped to create the first logo for 20th Century Pictures (later 20th Century-Fox, later 20th Century Studios).

== Personal life ==
Kosa Jr. was married twice: in 1928 to Mary Odisho (d. 1951) and in 1952 to dancer Elizabeth Twaddel.
