= National Watercolor Society =

- Founded at: California
- Legal status: Not-for-profit organization
- Headquarters: 915 South Pacific Avenue, San Pedro, California, US
- Leader: Denise Willing-Booher
- Website: Website

The National Watercolor Society is a non-profit society which is headed by artists, in San Pedro neighborhood of Los Angeles, California. Its main goal is to improve watercolor painting through trainings and exhibitions.

== History ==
The National Watercolor Society was established by Dana Bartlett in 1920, who was its first president, as the California Water Color Society. In 1967, the members of the society decided to rename the society as the California National Watercolor Society. In 1975, the society was renamed as the National Watercolor Society.

The National Watercolor Society held its first exhibition in the Los Angeles County Museum of Art. The society used the museum to hold annual exhibitions for 25 years.

In 1999, the foundation of the new building for the National Watercolor Society was laid. The building was financed with the support of the members of the society. The opening ceremony of the building was held in 2010.

== See also ==
- American Watercolor Society
- New England Watercolor Society
