= Phil Dike =

American painter and art teacher

- Born: 1906; Redlands, California, U.S.
- Died: 1990 (aged 83–84)
- Education: Chouinard Art Institute
- Occupations: Painter, art teacher

Phil Dike (1906-1990) was an American painter and art teacher. He painted watercolors, and he taught at Scripps College and the Claremont Graduate University. His work is in the permanent collections of the Metropolitan Museum of Art, the National Academy of Design, and the Library of Congress.
