= Guess (disambiguation) =

A guess is a conjecture or estimation. To "guess" is to make an estimation or suppose (something) without sufficient information to be sure of being correct.

Guess may also refer to:

- Guess (company), an American name-brand clothing line
- Guess (song), a 2024 song by Charli XCX
- Guess (TV program), a Taiwanese television variety show

== People ==
=== As a given name ===
- Guess Eleanor Birchett (1881–1979), American self-trained ornithologist and naturalist

=== As a surname ===
- Alvaleta Guess (1955–1996), American stage/musical theatre actress
- Carol Guess (born 1968), American novelist and poet
- Elizabeth Guess (born 1985), American soccer forward and midfielder
- Francis Guess (1946–2015), American businessman and civil rights advocate
- Gene Guess (1932–1975), American lawyer and politician
- George Guess (disambiguation)
  - Sequoyah (c. 1770–1843), Cherokee silversmith, named in English George Gist or George Guess
  - George W. Guess (c. 1822–1868), mayor of Dallas, Texas, 1866–1868
- Gretchen Guess (born 1969), American businesswoman and politician
- Jeff Guess (born 1948), Australian poet
- Sam C. Guess (1909–1989), American politician from the State of Washington
- Terry Guess (born 1974), American football player

== See also ==
- Guessing Game (disambiguation)
- Guess Who (disambiguation)
- Guesswork (album), a 2019 album by Lloyd Cole
- GESS (disambiguation)
- Güssing, a town in Burgenland in Austria
- Güssing District, an area in Burgenland in Austria
