= 1857–1858 Dallas mayoral election =

Mayoral election (1857. - 1858.)

- 1857–1858
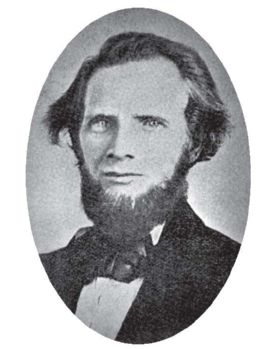
Candidate	John M. Crockett	Unknown
Party	Democratic
Popular vote	Unknown	Unknown
Mayor before election
Dr. Samuel B. Pryor
Independent
Elected mayor
John M. Crockett
Democratic

The 1857 Dallas mayoral election was the second mayoral election in Dallas, Texas. The election was held sometime between late 1857–1858. John M. Crockett won the election, becoming mayor.
