= 1875 Dallas mayoral election =

Election in Texas, United States

- April 6, 1875
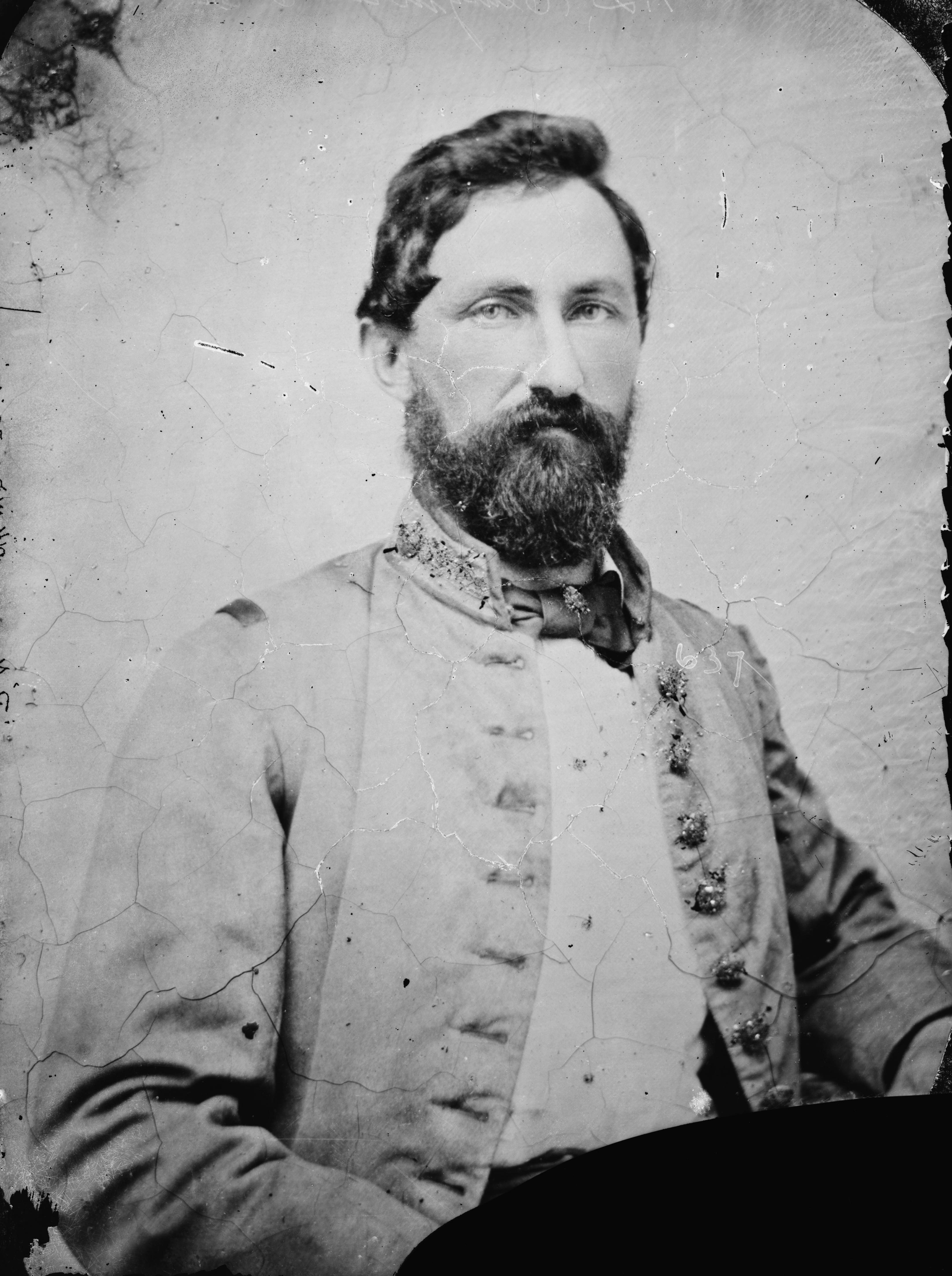
Candidate	W. L. Cabell	John Kerfoot	J. C. Bogel
Party	Independent	Independent	Independent
Popular vote	707	580	Unknown
Percentage	54%	45%	Unknown
Mayor before election
None (office created by the Dallas City Charter)
Elected mayor
Samuel B. Pryor
Independent

The 1875 Dallas mayoral election was a mayoral and municipal election in Dallas, Texas. The election was held on April 6, 1875. In the election, W. L. Cabell defeated challenger J. C. Bogel and eventual mayor John Kerfoot.
