= 1856 Dallas mayoral election =

Election in Dallas, Texas

- April 5, 1856
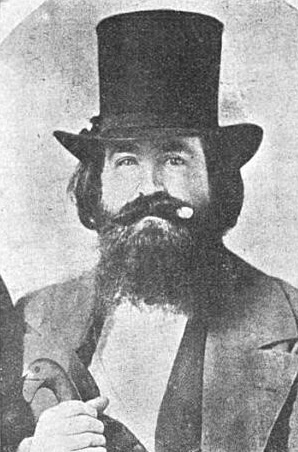
Candidate	Dr. Samuel B. Pryor	A. D. Rice
Party	Independent	Independent
Popular vote	58	34
Percentage	63.1%	36.9%
Mayor before election
Office established
Elected mayor
Dr. Samuel B. Pryor
Independent

The 1856 Dallas mayoral election was the first mayoral election in Dallas, Texas. The election was held on April 5, 1856. In the election, Dr. Samuel B. Pryor defeated challenger and eventual mayor A. D. Rice.
