= 2023 Dallas mayoral election =

- May 6, 2023
- Turnout: 7.1%
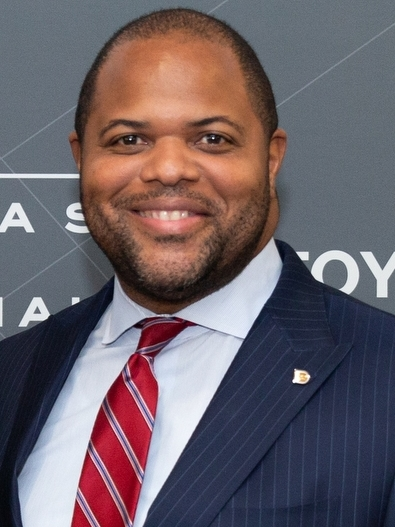
| Candidate | Eric Johnson |
| Popular vote | 44,942 |
| Percentage | 98.7% |
Mayor before election
Eric Johnson
Elected mayor
Eric Johnson

The 2023 Dallas mayoral election was held on May 6, 2023, to elect the mayor of Dallas, Texas. Incumbent mayor Eric Johnson ran for re-election to a second term in office. One other candidate qualified, declared write-in candidate Kendal Richardson, whom Johnson defeated with 98.7% of the vote, breaking a record set in 1909 by former Dallas mayor Stephen J. Hay for the highest vote percentage garnered by a mayoral candidate facing any opposition in Dallas history.

== Candidates ==
=== Declared ===
- Eric Johnson, incumbent mayor
- Kendal Richardson, nonprofit CEO

=== Disqualified ===
- Jrmar Jefferson, investor and perennial candidate (Note: Democratic candidate for California's 6th congressional district in 2016 and 2018; candidate for mayor of Sacramento, California in 2020; Democratic nominee for Texas's 1st congressional district in 2022) (was not certified as write-in candidate)

=== Declined ===
- Mike Ablon, real estate developer and candidate for mayor in 2019
- Michael Hinojosa, former Dallas Independent School District Superintendent
- Peter Brodsky, real estate developer
- Jennifer S. Gates, former member of the Dallas City Council
- Lynn McBee, philanthropist and candidate for mayor in 2019
- Miguel Solis, former Dallas Independent School District trustee and candidate for mayor in 2019

== Endorsements ==
Eric Johnson

Federal politicians

- Steve Bartlett, former U.S. Representative from Texas's 3rd congressional district (1983–1991) and former mayor of Dallas (1991–1995) (Republican)
- Eddie Bernice Johnson, former U.S. Representative from Texas's 30th congressional district (1993–2023), state senator (1987–1993), and state representative (1973–1977) (Democratic)
- Lance Gooden, U.S. Representative from Texas's 5th congressional district (since 2019) and state representative (2017–2019, 2011–2015) (Republican)
- Ron Kirk, former U.S. Trade Representative (2009–2013), former mayor of Dallas (1995–2002), and Texas secretary of state (1994–1995) (Democratic)
- Marc Veasey, U.S. Representative from Texas's 33rd congressional district (since 2013) and state representative (2005–2013) (Democratic)

State politicians

- Royce West, state senator (since 1993) and president pro tempore of the state senate (2006–2007) (Democratic)

Local politicians

- Tom Leppert, former mayor of Dallas (2007–2011) and businessman (Republican)
- Mary Poss, former mayor of Dallas (2001–2002)

Organizations

- Dallas Police Association
- Dallas Fire Fighters Association

== Results ==
2023 Dallas mayoral election
| Candidate | Votes | % |
|---|---|---|
| Eric Johnson (incumbent) | 44,942 | 98.70 |
| Write-in | 593 | 1.30 |
| Total votes | 45,535 | 100.00 |
