= 1925 Dallas mayoral election =

- April 3, 1925
Candidate	Louis Blaylock	Marvin E. Martin	W.S. Brambett
Party	Independent	Independent	Independent
Popular vote	14,386	5,209	506
Percentage	71.3%	25.8%	2.5%
Candidate	M. A. Smith
Party	Independent
Popular vote	62
Percentage	0.3%
Mayor before election
Sawnie R. Aldredge
Elected mayor
Louis Blaylock

The 1925 Dallas mayoral election was a mayoral election held alongside municipal elections in Dallas. Louis Blaylock beat Marvin E. Martin, W.S. Brambett, and, M.A. Smith, his opponents, for the office of mayor.
