= 1861 Texas lieutenant gubernatorial election =

- August 5, 1861
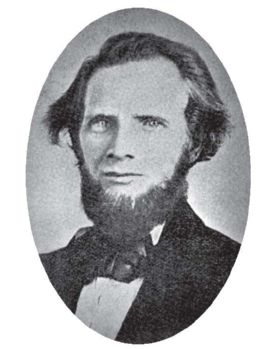

| Nominee | John McClannahan Crockett | Frederick F. Foscue | M. D. K. Taylor |
| Party | Independent | Independent | Independent |
| Popular vote | 38,321 | 12,160 | 2,456 |
| Percentage | 72.4% | 23.0% | 4.6% |
Lieutenant Governor before election
Vacant
Elected Lieutenant Governor
John McClannahan Crockett
Independent

The 1861 Texas lieutenant gubernatorial election was held on August 5, 1861, to elect the lieutenant governor of Texas. This was the first election in the state after Texas had seceded from the Union and joined the Confederate States. Independent candidate John McClannahan Crockett defeated his foremost opponent Frederick Foscue to become the eighth lieutenant governor of the state.

== Background ==
Following the election of Abraham Lincoln, the Texas became involved in the Secession crisis. There was a campaign for Texas to call a convention to vote on the issue, but only the Governor can call a special session of the legislature. Governor Sam Houston was a unionist and refused to do so. A secession convention was organized without government approval and Houston called for a special legislative session in January 1861 in the hopes that the legislature would declare the rogue convention illegal. This plan backfired and a convention was legalized which approved a Ordinance of Secession. When secession was approved by referendum, Houston refused to swear an oath of loyalty to the newly formed Confederate States of America. The legislature in turn removed Houston from office and Lieutenant Governor Edward Clark was sworn in as governor leaving the office of lieutenant governor vacant. The Civil War was in full swing and the conduct of the war was the core of the campaign.

== General election ==
On election day, Crockett won with an overwhelming margin of over 72% of the vote. The legislature certified the election on November 11, 1861, and Lubbock was sworn into office on December 21, 1861.

=== Candidates ===
- John McClannahan Crockett, lawyer, mayor of Dallas, meteorological observor for the Smithsonian
- Frederick Forney Foscue, lawyer, state representative, former member of the Alabama House of Representatives
- Marion DeKalb "M. D. K." Taylor, speaker of the Texas House of Representatives

=== Results ===
Texas lieutenant gubernatorial election, 1861 (Note: Write-in includes "Jones" who received 13 votes and "Hemphill" who received 10.)
| Party | Candidate | Votes | % |
|---|---|---|---|
| Independent | John McClannahan Crockett | 38,321 | 72.36 |
| Independent | Frederick F. Foscue | 12,160 | 22.96 |
| Independent | M. D. K. Taylor | 2,456 | 4.64 |
| Write-in | | 23 | 0.00 |
| Total votes | | 52,960 | 100.00 |
| Independent hold | | | |
