= Enosinian Society =

Debate and literary society at George Washington University, US

- Founded: March 6, 1822; 204 years ago George Washington University
- Type: Literary
- Affiliation: Independent
- Status: Active
- Scope: Local
- Colors: Blue
- Publication: Enosinian Bee
- Chapters: 1
- Full Name: The George Washington University Debate & Literary Society
- Headquarters: 2121 I Street NW; Washington, D.C. 20052; United States
- Website: sites.google.com/view/gwdls/home/

The Enosinian Society is a debate and literary society founded in 1822 during the first semester of the Columbian College. Its full name is The George Washington University Debate & Literary Society. It is the oldest student society at the university and its members remain dedicated to the society's founding purpose of "improving ourselves in knowledge, eloquence, and every accomplishment by which we may be the better prepared for any station in life."

== History ==
The Enosinian Society was formed on March 6, 1822, during the first semester of the Columbian College. Its fifteen charter members created the group as a debating society. A constitution was drafted and the society adopted the name of the Enosinian. The original society met at Enosinian Hall, located on the fourth floor of the Columbian College's main building at College Hill, D.C. The society's first formal event was the celebration of Independence Day on July 4, 1822. In the fall of 1822, the Enosinian Society established its library and reading room within the college's main library.

The emblem of the society was adopted in 1824, and a banner was gifted to the society by the ladies of Washington, which remained in the society's hall until the sale of the College Hill campus in the 1870s.

The Marquis de Lafayette visited Columbian College on December 13, 1824, and was greeted by the members of the Enosinian Society, who tended to Lafayette throughout his visit to the college. In return, Lafayette and his son agreed to be inducted as the first honorary members of the Enosinian Society. A bust was placed in the original Enosinian Hall in his honor and a debate tradition known as the "Lafayette Debates" was established.

In 1827, The Columbian College suspended operations due to financial issues, and consequently, the society suspended its operations. With the reopening of the college in 1829, students gathered to reorganize the society; however, regular meetings and debates did not resume until 1833. In 1838, the society established the Enosinian Bee, a weekly newspaper publishing the work of society members. It also published essays and pamphlets. By 1856, the society's library included some 2,000 volumes, mostly about history and philosophy.

The society has suspended operations several times throughout its history. Operations were disbanded during the American Civil War due to low enrollment in the College after many students left to fight in the conflict. By its 80th anniversary in 1902, the society was coeducational. However, by 1915, the society had again been inactive for several years.

=== George Washington University ===
After the Columbian College changed its name to The George Washington University, the Enosinian Society reformed, eventually becoming the George Washington University Debate Team. The society celebrated its 100th anniversary in 1922. Later, it changed its name to The George Washington University Debate & Literary Society, to be more easily recognizable at public events and intercollegiate debate tournaments. Its mission is "improving ourselves in knowledge, eloquence and every accomplishment by which we may be the better prepared for any station in life."

In addition to the GWU Debate & Literary Society carrying on the society's intellectual traditions, and the Enosinian Society being retained as the name of the GWU Debate & Literary Society alumni group and newsletter, the Enosinian name has been adopted by several student organizations that have emerged and died out since 2000 as well as the GWU Enosinian Scholars Program.

== Symbols ==
The society's name comes from the Greek word meaning "to shake" or "to contend". Its ribbon is blue and its badge is gold. The GWU Debate & Literary Society currently publishes an annual newsletter entitled, the Enosinian Bee.

== Activities ==
In 2013, the GWU Debate & Literary Society revived the Lafayette Debates tradition in partnership with the Embassy of France to the United States to create one of the most prestigious international civic debating competitions hosted in the United States.

== Notable members ==
- Walker Brooke (Class of 1831), U.S. Senator from Mississippi
- Christopher Pearse Cranch, writer and artist
- William Carey Crane (Class of 1836), former president of Baylor University
- Elliott Coues (Class of 1859), noted surgeon, historian, ornithologist, and author
- Thomas D. Eliot (Class of 1825), U.S. Congressman from Massachusetts
- William Greenleaf Eliot (Class of 1829), founder of Washington University in St. Louis
- Howard Lincoln Hodgkins (Class of 1881), dean and ad interim president of George Washington University
- John D. Kerfoot (Class of 185x ?), mayor of Dallas, Texas
- Henry May (Class of 1832), former U.S. Congressman from Maryland
- William D. Porter (Class of 1825), Commodore, U.S Navy
- Syngman Rhee (Class of 1907), President of South Korea from 1948 to 1960
- Baron Stow (Class of 1825), writer, editor, and influential Baptist reverend
- Richard Wallach (Class of 1829), first Republican mayor of Washington, D.C.

=== Honorary members ===
- John Quincy Adams, President of the United States
- William Cullen Bryant, poet, author of "Thanatopsis"
- John C. Calhoun, Vice President of the United States, U.S. Secretary of State, U.S. Secretary of War, and U.S. Senator from South Carolina
- Henry Clay, U.S. Secretary of State, Speaker of the United States House of Representatives, and U.S. Senator from Kentucky
- Edward Everett Hale, historian and Unitarian minister
- Robert Y. Hane, United States Senate, Governor of South Carolina, and as Mayor of Charleston
- Washington Irving, author of "The Legend of Sleepy Hollow" and "Rip Van Winkle"
- George Washington Lafayette, son of Marquis de Lafayette
- Marquis de Lafayette, Revolutionary War hero and friend of George Washington
- Martin Van Buren, President of the United States
- Daniel Webster, U.S. Secretary of State and U.S. Senator from Massachusetts
- Nathaniel Parker Willis, author
