= War Risk Insurance Act =

- Long title: An Act to authorize the establishment of a Bureau of War Risk Insurance in the Treasury Department
- Acronyms (colloquial): BWRI
- Enacted by: the 63rd United States Congress
- Effective: September 2, 1914

Citations
- Public law: Public Law 63-193
- Statutes at Large: 38 Stat. 711

Legislative history
- Introduced in the Senate as S. 6331 by Robert L. Owen (D‑OK) on August 12, 1914; Committee consideration by Senate Committee on Commerce; Passed the Senate on August 21, 1914 (Voice vote); Passed the House of Representatives on August 29, 1914 (230–58); Reported by the joint conference committee on August 31 – September 1, 1914; agreed to by the House of Representatives on September 1, 1914 (Voice vote) and by the Senate on September 2, 1914 (Voice vote); Signed into law by President Woodrow Wilson on September 2, 1914

Major amendments
- Act of June 12, 1917 (40 Stat. 102), War Risk Insurance Act of 1917 (40 Stat. 398)

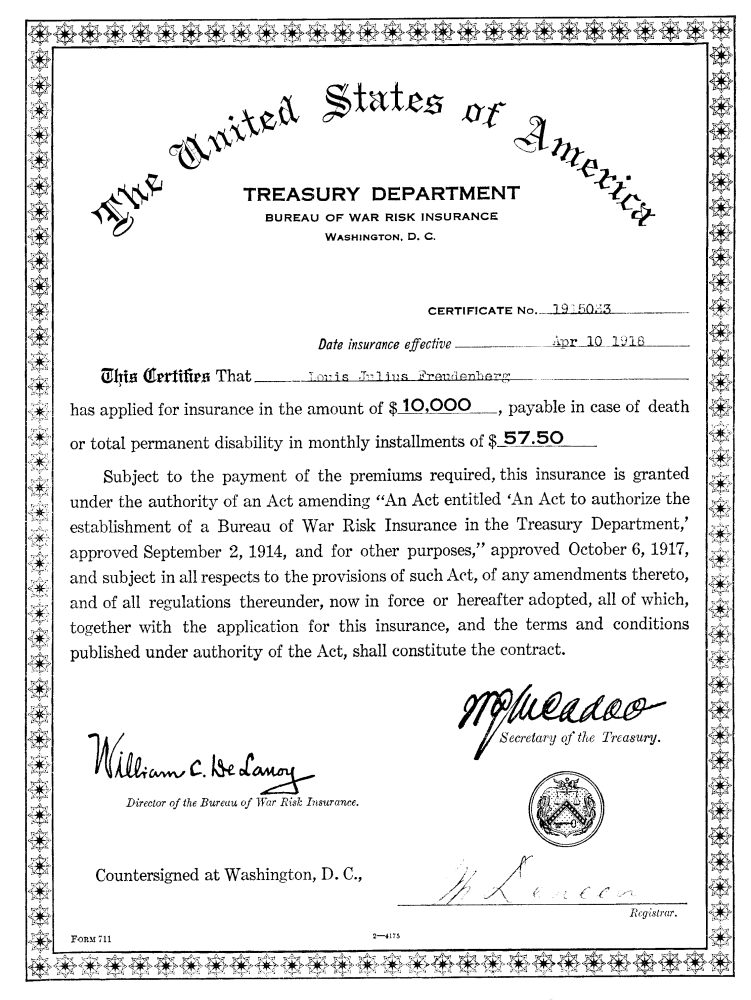

The War Risk Insurance Act was a piece of legislation passed by the United States Congress in 1914 to ensure the availability of war risk insurance for shipping vessels and individuals during World War I. It established a Bureau of War Risk Insurance within the Treasury Department to provide insurance policies and pay claims. On October 6, 1917, the War Risk Insurance Act of 1917 amended the insurance program to make life insurance coverage available to sailors in the United States Merchant Marine.

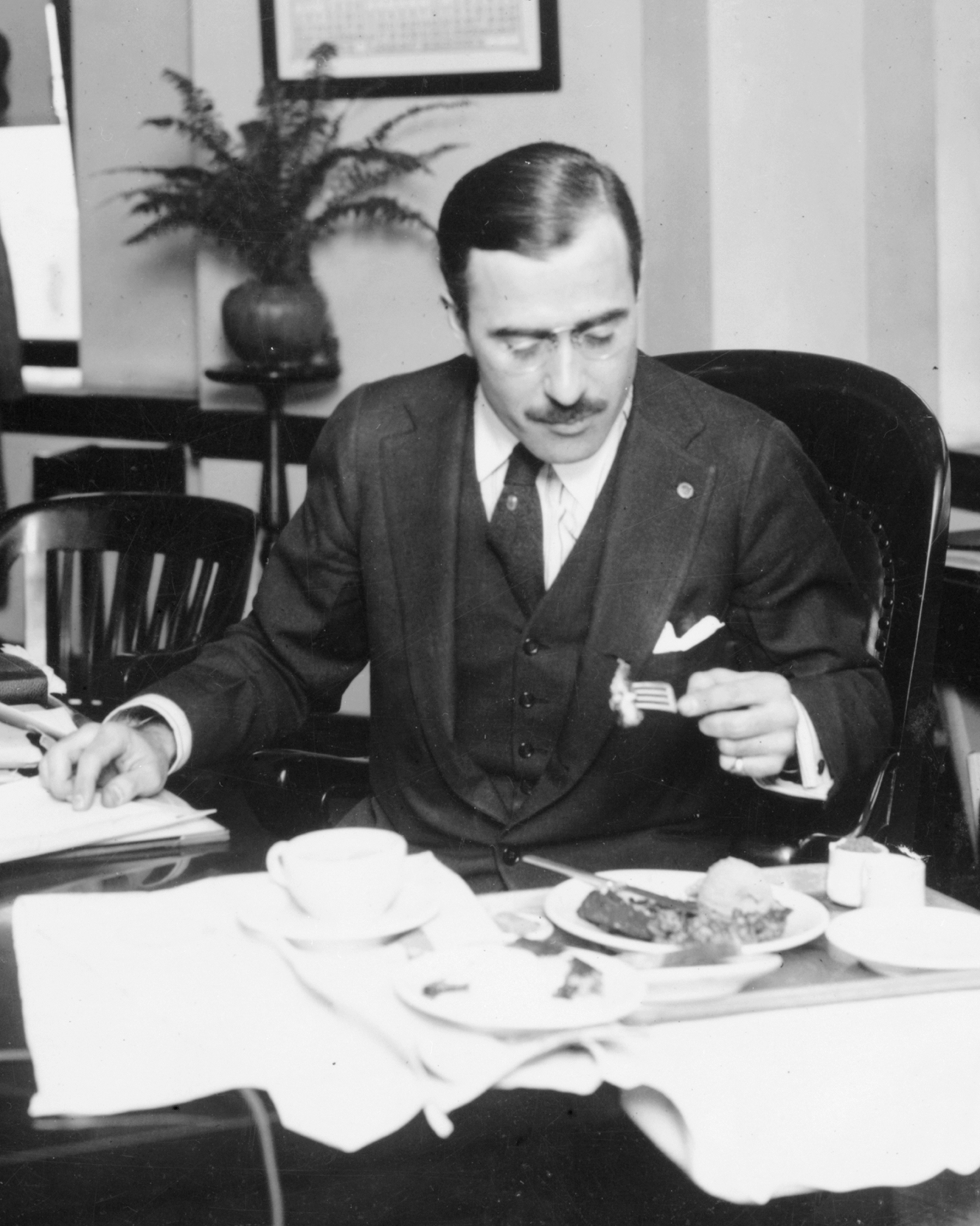
Richard Gilder Cholmeley-Jones, Director of the War Risk Bureau, eating lunch at his desk

Henry D. Lindsley served as director from December 1918 to August 1920. He was followed by R. A. Cholmeley-Jones.

== 1914 Act and Associated U.S. Congressional Amendments ==
Chronological legislation relative to the 1914 public law and legislative revisions as pertaining to the War Risk Insurance Act.

Date of Enactment	Public Law Number	U.S. Statute Citation	U.S. Legislative Bill	U.S. Presidential Administration
September 2, 1914	P.L. 63-193	38 Stat. 711	S. 6357	Woodrow Wilson
August 11, 1916	P.L. 64-209	39 Stat. 514	H.R. 13224	Woodrow Wilson
March 3, 1917	P.L. 64-387	39 Stat. 1131	H.R. 20082	Woodrow Wilson
June 12, 1917	P.L. 65-20	40 Stat. 102	S. 2133	Woodrow Wilson
October 6, 1917	P.L. 65-90	40 Stat. 398	H.R. 5723	Woodrow Wilson
April 2, 1918	Pub. Res. 65-27	40 Stat. 502	S.J.Res. 133	Woodrow Wilson
May 20, 1918	P.L. 65-151	40 Stat. 555	H.R. 11245	Woodrow Wilson
June 25, 1918	P.L. 65-175	40 Stat. 609	S. 4482	Woodrow Wilson
July 11, 1918	P.L. 65-195	40 Stat. 897	H.R. 11048	Woodrow Wilson
February 25, 1919	P.L. 65-272	40 Stat. 1160	H.R. 13273	Woodrow Wilson
March 4, 1921	P.L. 66-384	41 Stat. 1364	H.R. 15894	Woodrow Wilson
August 9, 1921	P.L. 67-47	42 Stat. 147	H.R. 6611	Warren Harding
September 22, 1922	P.L. 67-361	42 Stat. 1038	H.R. 10196	Warren Harding
December 18, 1922	P.L. 67-370	42 Stat. 1064	H.R. 8062	Warren Harding
March 2, 1923	P.L. 67-460	42 Stat. 1374	H.R. 10003	Warren Harding
March 4, 1923	P.L. 67-542	42 Stat. 1521	H.R. 14401	Warren Harding
June 7, 1924	P.L. 68-242	43 Stat. 607	S. 2257	Calvin Coolidge
