= John Kerfoot =

John Kerfoot may refer to:

- John Barrett Kerfoot, college president and Episcopal bishop
- John D. Kerfoot, mayor of Dallas
