= J. Waddy Tate =

American mayor (1870–1938)

38th Mayor of Dallas
- In office 1929–1931
- Preceded by: R. E. Burt
- Succeeded by: Tom Bradford

Personal details
- Born: February 21, 1870 Columbus, Texas, U.S.
- Died: January 11, 1938 (aged 67) Dallas, Texas, U.S.
- Resting place: Glenwood Cemetery, Houston, Texas
- Spouse: Blanche Kennedy
- Occupation: Railroad

J. Waddy Tate (February 21, 1870 – January 11, 1938) was the mayor of Dallas, Texas, from 1929 to 1931.

== Biography ==
John Waddy Tate was born February 21, 1870, in Columbus, Colorado, Texas, at the Tate-Senftenberg-Brandon House. Tate's parents were local entrepreneur Phocion Tate and Bettie Branch Carter a descendant of William Thornton. His father died in 1876 and his mother remarried in 1882 to David T. Davis. Following his mother's second marriage the family removed to Houston, Texas. He married Blanche Kennedy on May 28, 1901, in Laredo, Webb County, Texas.

As a young man, he worked as a printer and in a sawmill. He joined the Cotton Belt Line in Houston and later the Chicago Great Western Line in Dallas. He retired from the railroad lines in 1919, but by 1920, he was in the oil drilling business.

In a brief obituary Time Magazine noted: "In the 1927 mayoralty campaign, Tate wore blue overalls, carried a fishing rod, lost; but two years later he spent only $218 campaigning, bought frankfurters for 10,000 voters, won hands down."

He died January 11, 1938, in Dallas, Texas, and was interred in Glenwood Cemetery, Houston, Texas.

| Preceded by R. E. Burt | Mayors of Dallas; 1931–1932 | Succeeded by Tom Bradford |
