= Fayette Smith =

American politician

Joshua Lafayette "Fayette" Smith (June 29, 1830 – July 2, 1867) was mayor of Dallas, Texas, in 1861; he was shot to death in 1867 on the steps of the courthouse. He was also known as Fayette Smith. He was born to the Reverend James Anderson Smith and Anne Killen Smith. The Smith family moved to Texas in 1846. He was married to Margaret (née Sims) Daniel.

Preceded by John M. Crockett	Mayors of Dallas; 1861	Succeeded by Thomas E. Sherwood
