= Thomas E. Sherwood =

American politician

Rev. Thomas Emory Sherwood

7th Mayor of Dallas
- In office 1861–1862
- Preceded by: J. L. Smith
- Succeeded by: No mayor due to the American Civil War

Personal details
- Born: May 31, 1835 Washington County, Indiana
- Died: April 10, 1897 (aged 61) Dodd City, Fannin County, Texas
- Resting place: City Cemetery, Sulphur Springs, Texas
- Spouse: Nannie Lavinia Henry McCreary
- Children: 3
- Education: Dolbear Commercial College, New Orleans, Louisiana
- Occupation: Minister

Military service
- Allegiance: CSA
- Branch/service: Co. C, 15th Texas Cavalry
- Years of service: 1862–1863
- Rank: Private, Commissary

Thomas E. Sherwood (May 31, 1835 – April 10, 1897) was the first post master of Farmersville, Texas (1857), mayor of Dallas, Texas (1861–1862) and became a Methodist minister in 1867.

== Biography ==
Thomas Emory Sherwood was born in Washington County, Indiana, to Rev. Jeremiah Sherwood and Sarah Elrod on May 31, 1835. Around 1842, Sherwood’s parents moved the family to Kauffman County, Texas, where his father was a Methodist Minister. On October 30, 1856, he married Nancy (Nannie) Lavinia McCreary in Rockwall, Texas, which was in Kauffman County at the time. (Note: Rockwall county was created in 1873.) The couple had two daughters and two sons named Lucretia, Effy, Marvin, and Alvin respectively.

From 1857–1859, Sherwood served as the postmaster in Farmersville, Texas, in Collin County. He left this post and moved to Dallas, where he was elected mayor in August 1861 at age 26. Serving with him was Peter Stevenson as marshal and George W. Guess, James N. Smith, Edward W. Hunt, William W. Peak, and Dr. Samuel B. Pryor as aldermen.

Records of city government at this time are sparse, and it is unknown whether Sherwood resigned as mayor to join the Civil War or if his term had ended. In either case, he was the last mayor until 1868. During the Civil War, no mayors, either appointed or elected, served Dallas.

In 1862, at age 27, he enlisted in the Confederate States Army. He was part of Company C of the 15th Texas Cavalry Regiment led by Colonel George Sweet. Sherwood was promoted from his enlistment rank of private to Commissary of Subsistence before being discharged.

After the war, in 1866, following in his father's footsteps, Sherwood was licensed to preach by the Dallas Circuit, Dallas District, East Texas Methodist Conference. He was ordained in 1870. He traveled as a circuit rider and preached in North Central and East Texas, including Greenville, Rockwall, Sulphur Springs, Honey Grove, Pilot Point, Wichita Falls, Scyene, Sherman, Pottsboro, Bonham, and Dodd City. His final assignment was in Sulphur Springs, Texas. While in Scyene, he was also a teacher from 1869–1871 at the Scyene Masonic Institute in Scyene, Texas.

Sherwood died April 10, 1897, in Dodd City, Texas, and was interred in City Cemetery, Sulphur Springs, Texas.
