= George Sprague =

American mayor

George Able Sprague

42nd Mayor of Dallas
- In office 1937–1939
- Preceded by: George Sergeant
- Succeeded by: Woodall Rodgers

Personal details
- Born: November 30, 1871 Preston, Minnesota, U.S.
- Died: November 8, 1963 (aged 91) Dallas, Texas, U.S.
- Resting place: Oak Cliff Cemetery
- Spouse: Minna Schwartz
- Children: George S., Mortimer L., Elizabeth, Wilma, Howard Isaac, John F., Natalie, and Charles Cameron

George Able Sprague (November 30, 1871 – November 8, 1963) was an American businessman and mayor of Dallas from 1935 to 1937.

Sprague was born in Preston, Fillmore County, Minnesota, to Isaac Sprague and Anna Jeannette Plummer. He married Minna Schwartz, daughter of Ernest O. Schwartz and Elizabeth Gossman, on December 25, 1900, Preston, Fillmore, Minnesota. They had eight children: George S., Mortimer L., Elizabeth, Wilma, Howard Isaac, John F., Natalie, and Charles Cameron.

In Fillmore County, Minnesota, Sprague taught school, operated a general store and was postmaster. As a traveling salesman, he came to Dallas where he eventually settled. He later managed a warehouse. He was active in the Oak Cliff area of Dallas and was active in the Oak Cliff Dads Club. He was involved in the formation of a Central Dads Club and headed it in its first year. His sons were noted for their skills in football at the collegiate level bringing recognition to Dallas.

Sprague was elected to the city council in 1936 and 1937; and as mayor in 1937. In the 1937 city council election, Sprague received the largest number of votes citywide. The city council then selected him as its mayor. During his time as mayor, Sprague supported the merger of Dallas, University Park and Highland Park and the election of the mayor by the citizens instead of the city council. The Dallas School Board named its new football stadium in southwest Dallas "Sprague Field" in honor of the family.

Sprague died November 8, 1963, in Dallas, Texas, and was interred at the Oak Cliff Cemetery, Dallas.
