= 2003 Dallas mayoral election =

- May 3, 2003
| Candidate | Laura Miller | Margaret A. Donnelly |
| Popular vote | 52,955 | 37,482 |
| Percentage | 56.07% | 39.69% |
Mayor before election
Laura Miller
Elected Mayor
Laura Miller

The 2003 Dallas mayoral election took place on May 3, 2003, to elect the mayor of Dallas, Texas. The race was officially nonpartisan. It saw the reelection of Laura Miller, who won the election by taking a majority in the initial round of voting, thereby negating the need for a runoff to be held.

== Results ==
Results
| Party | Candidate | Votes | % |
|---|---|---|---|
| Nonpartisan | Laura Miller (incumbent) | 52,955 | 56.07 |
| Nonpartisan | Mary Poss | 37,482 | 39.69 |
| Nonpartisan | E. Edward Opka | 1,999 | 2.12 |
| Nonpartisan | Jurline Hollins | 1,143 | 1.21 |
| Nonpartisan | Erik Saenz | 865 | 0.92 |
| Total votes | | 94,444 | |
