= R. E. Burt =

American mayor (1862–1943)

Robert Eugene Burt

37th Mayor of Dallas
- In office 1927–1929
- Preceded by: Louis Blaylock
- Succeeded by: J. Waddy Tate

Personal details
- Born: October 1, 1862 Drew County, Arkansas, U.S.
- Died: August 9, 1943 (aged 79) Houston, Texas, U.S.
- Resting place: Forest Park Cemetery, Houston, Texas
- Spouse: Mary Emma "Mamie" Boone
- Children: Robbie May Burt, Joseph Henry Burt
- Occupation: Oil

Robert E. Burt was president of the Dallas Oil Company in the early 20th century and the mayor of Dallas, Texas, from 1927 to 1929.

== Biography ==
Burt was born in Drew County, Arkansas, on October 1, 1862, to James Henry Burt and Catherine Frances Turrentine. He was the son of a school teacher who moved to Dallas as a young man. He worked in a clothing store, but moved to Beaumont, Texas, when oil was discovered there. He became a prominent oil man in Houston. He returned to Dallas in the early 1920s. He became president of Atlantic and Gulf Petroleum Company.

Burt married Mary Emma “Mamie” Boone (1867–1949), daughter of Joseph Boone and Martha Sarah Prince on 5 Sept 1888 in Dallas, Texas. They had two children. Burt was a devout Baptist and was the chairman of the executive board of the Baptist General Convention of Texas. He was President of the board of Mary Hardin-Baylor College and served on several other boards including: The Baptist Standard, Baylor University and Southwestern Baptist Seminary.

Burt was elected Mayor of Dallas in 1927 on a non-partisan ticket. While in office, he instituted a city manager form of government and formulated a master plan for city improvements.

Burt refused to run for a second term as mayor and returned to Houston in 1935, where he died on August 9, 1943, at the age of 80.
