= 2019 Dallas mayoral election =

- May 4, 2019
- Registered: 1,363,892
- Turnout: 134,820; 9.88%
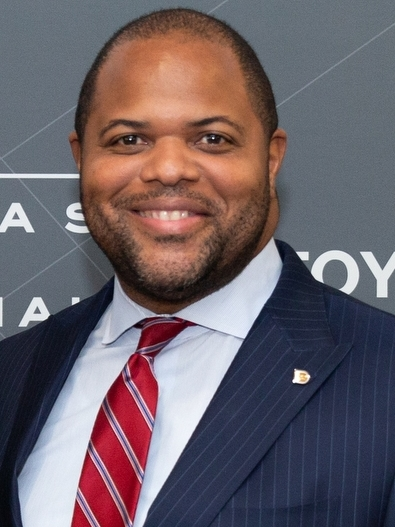

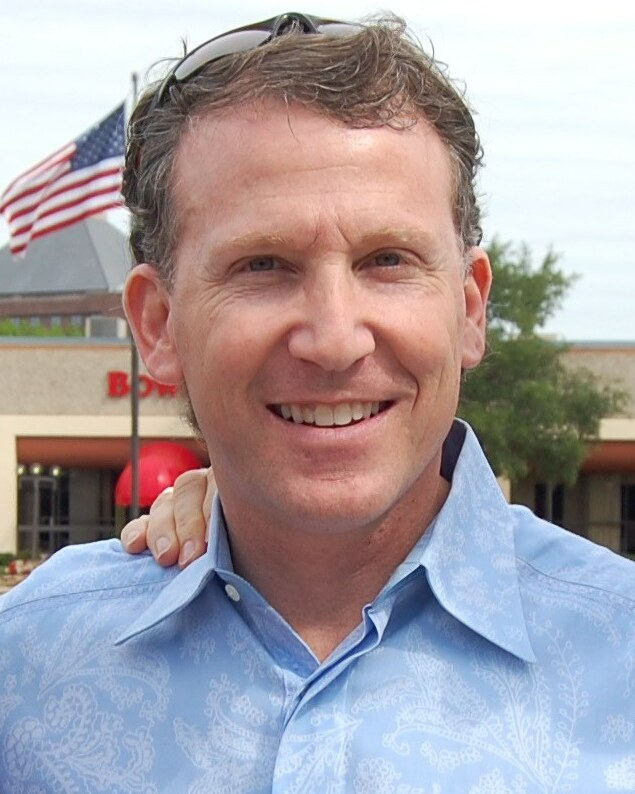

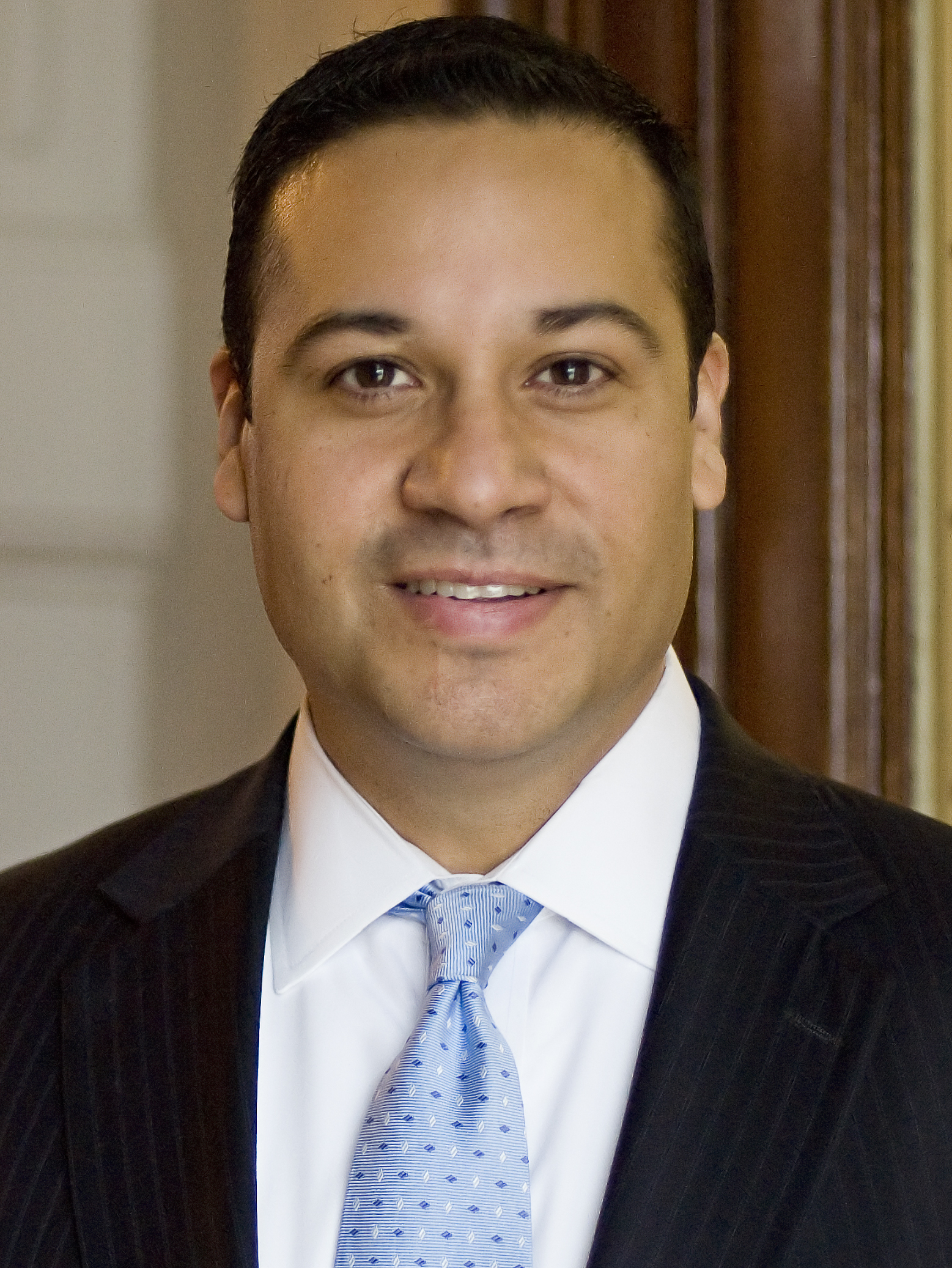
Nominee	Eric Johnson	Scott Griggs	Lynn McBee
First round	16,374; 20.3%	14,901; 18.5%	11,309; 14.0%
Runoff	41,208; 55.6%	32,898; 44.4%	Eliminated
Nominee	Mike Ablon	Miguel Solis	Regina Montoya
First round	10,859; 13.5%	8,640; 10.7%	8,428; 10.5%
Runoff	Eliminated	Eliminated	Eliminated
Nominee	Jason Villalba	Albert Black
First round	5,440; 6.8%	4,205; 5.2%
Runoff	Eliminated	Eliminated
- Runoff results by precinct Johnson: 50–60% 60–70% 70–80% 80–90% >90% Griggs: 50–60% 60–70% 70–80% 80–90% >90% Tie: 50% No data
Mayor before election
Mike Rawlings
Elected mayor
Eric Johnson

On May 4, 2019, the city of Dallas, Texas, held an election to choose the next Mayor of Dallas. The election began as a nonpartisan blanket primary, no candidate took a majority of over 50% of the total vote so the two top vote-earners Eric Johnson and Scott Griggs advanced to a runoff election on June 8. Incumbent mayor Mike Rawlings was unable to run for reelection due to term limits. Dallas also concurrently elected all 14 members of its city council, and 3 of the 9 total members of the Dallas Independent School District. Johnson won the runoff with 55.61%.

== Candidates ==
Thirteen candidates declared campaigns for Dallas Mayor ahead of the filing deadline. One dropped out voluntary, while three failed to qualify, which left nine candidates for the May ballot.

=== Qualified candidates ===
- Mike Ablon, real estate developer
- Albert Black, chair of the Dallas Housing Authority
- Scott Griggs, Dallas City Councilmember, District 1
- Eric Johnson, member of the Texas House of Representatives
- Alyson Kennedy, activist, Socialist Workers Party member, 2016 presidential candidate
- Lynn McBee, philanthropist
- Regina Montoya, attorney, former aide during the Presidency of Bill Clinton, and Democratic nominee for Texas's 5th congressional district in 2000
- Miguel Solis, Dallas Independent School District Trustee, District 8
- Jason Villalba, former member of the Texas House of Representatives

=== Did not qualify ===
- Heriberto Ortiz
- Miguel Patino, resident of Oak Cliff
- Stephen S. Smith

=== Dropped out of race ===
- Larry Casto, former Dallas City Attorney endorsed Mike Ablon

== Endorsements ==
Eric Johnson
- Colin Allred, U.S. Representative
- Eddie Bernice Johnson, U.S. Representative
- Lance Gooden, U.S. Representative
- Sylvia Garcia, U.S. Representative
- Mike Rawlings, Mayor of Dallas
- Ron Kirk, former Mayor of Dallas
- Tom Leppert, former Mayor of Dallas
- Steve Bartlett, former Mayor of Dallas
- Royce West, Texas State Senator, District 23
- John Carona, former Texas State Senator, District 16
- Roberto Alonzo, former Texas State Representative, District 104
- Linda Koop, former Texas State Representative; former member of the Dallas City Council
- Michelle Beckley, Texas State Representative, District 65
- Terry Meza, Texas State Representative, District 105
- Victoria Neave, Texas State Representative, District 107
- Carl O. Sherman, Texas State Representative, District 109
- Helen Giddings, Texas State Representative, District 109
- Angie Chen Button, Texas State Representative, District 112
- Dan Huberty, Texas State Representative, District 127
- Harold Dutton Jr., Texas State Representative, District 142
- Greg Ellis, former professional football player
Scott Griggs
- Jessica Gonzalez, Texas State Representative, District 104
- Ana-Maria Ramos, Texas State Representative, District 102
- Angela Hunt, former Dallas City Council Member, District 14
- Philip Kingston, Dallas City Council Member, District 14
- Adam Medrano, Dallas City Council Member, District 2; former Dallas Independent School District Trustee, District 8
- Omar Narvaez, Dallas City Council Member, District 6
- Mark Clayton, Dallas City Council Member, District 9

Organizations

- Our Revolution
Mike Ablon
- Larry Casto, former Dallas City Attorney
Regina Montoya
- Hillary Clinton, 67th United States Secretary of State; Former United States Senator from New York; Former First Lady of the United States
Jason Villalba
- George P. Bush, Land Commissioner of Texas
- Poncho Nevárez, Texas State Representative, District 74

== Results ==
Dallas mayoral election results, 2019
Party	Candidate	Votes	%
Nonpartisan	Eric Johnson	16,374	20.31
Nonpartisan	Scott Griggs	14,901	18.48
Nonpartisan	Lynn McBee	11,309	14.03
Nonpartisan	Mike Ablon	10,859	13.47
Nonpartisan	Miguel Solis	8,640	10.72
Nonpartisan	Regina Montoya	8,428	10.45
Nonpartisan	Jason Villalba	5,440	6.75
Nonpartisan	Albert Black	4,205	5.22
Nonpartisan	Alyson Kennedy	469	0.58
Total votes		80,625	100

Dallas mayoral runoff election results, 2019
Party	Candidate	Votes	%
Nonpartisan	Eric Johnson	41,208	55.61
Nonpartisan	Scott Griggs	32,898	44.39
Total votes		74,106	100
