= 2002 Dallas mayoral special election =

- January 19, 2002 (first round); February 16, 2002 (runoff)
- Turnout: 21.68% (first round); 21.82% (runoff)
Candidate	Laura Miller	Tom Dunning	Domingo García
First round vote	64,224	51,302	14,631
First round percentage	48.80%	38.98%	11.12%
Runoff vote	72,983	60,053
Runoff percentage	54.86%	45.14%
Mayor before election
Ron Kirk
Elected mayor
Laura Miller

The 2002 Dallas mayoral special election took place on January 19 and February 16, 2002, to elect the mayor of Dallas, Texas, after Ron Kirk resigned as mayor to run for the United States Senate seat up for election that year.

The race was officially nonpartisan. Since no candidate secured a majority in the first round, top-two finishers advanced to a runoff election, which Laura Miller won.

== Results ==
=== First round ===
Results
Party	Candidate	Votes	%
Nonpartisan	Laura Miller	64,224	48.80
Nonpartisan	Tom Dunning	51,302	38.98
Nonpartisan	Domingo García	14,631	11.12
Nonpartisan	Marvin E. Crenshaw	1,214	0.92
Nonpartisan	Jurline Hollins	226	0.17
Total votes		131,597	

=== Runoff ===
Results
Party	Candidate	Votes	%
Nonpartisan	Laura Miller	72,983	54.86
Nonpartisan	Tom Dunning	60,053	45.14
Total votes		133,036	
