= Domingo García (politician) =

American politician

51st President of the League of United Latin American Citizens
- In office August 2018 – June 29, 2024
- Preceded by: Roger Rocha
- Succeeded by: Roman Palomares

Member of the Texas House of Representatives from the 104th district
- In office January 14, 1997 – January 14, 2003
- Preceded by: Roberto Alonzo
- Succeeded by: Roberto Alonzo

Personal details
- Born: February 26, 1958 (age 68) Midland, Texas, U.S.
- Party: Democratic
- Education: University of North Texas (BA); Texas Southern University (JD); El Colegio de México (MA)

Domingo García is an American lawyer and politician who was the 51st President of League of United Latin American Citizens (LULAC) from 2018 to 2024. He previously served as a member of the Dallas City Council, Mayor Pro Tem of Dallas, and a member of the Texas House of Representatives.

== Early life and career ==
Garcia was born on February 26, 1958 and raised by his parents Alberto "Beto" Garcia Perez and Manuela Garcia Cano. His father was a rancher and held a successful concrete company in the Dallas area. Garcia is the oldest of his seven siblings. Growing up in for most of his childhood Richardson, Texas. Garcia played soccer, football, and even won golden gloves in boxing one year. He was heavily active with the school counsel of his high school Berkner. García earned Bachelor of Arts degree from the University of North Texas in 1980 and his Juris Doctor from Texas Southern University's Thurgood Marshall School of Law in Houston in 1983. He then worked as a personal injury lawyer. He then went to El Colegio de México for a master's in international relations.

== Political career ==
García was first elected to the Dallas City Council in 1991 and served until 1995. He was elected Mayor Pro Tem of Dallas in 1993 and became the first Latino to hold that post.

=== Texas House of Representatives ===
He served in the Texas House of Representatives for three terms. He was the co-author of HB1403, known as the Texas Instate-Tuition Act, or the Texas Dream Act. This bill was the first in the country to allow undocumented students from Texas high schools to pay in-state tuition at Texas State Universities.

García was a candidate in Dallas's 2002 mayoral special election, but came 3rd. In 2009 Garcia was embroiled in a scandal involving the Mexican consulate and allegations of witness tampering in a dispute over a multimillion-dollar jury award. Garcia has denied any wrongdoing in the situation.

=== United States House of Representatives ===
He also ran for the new 33rd district in the 2012 elections but lost in the primary. He opted not to run for Congress in 2014.

== LULAC ==
García was elected president of the League of United Latin American Citizens (LULAC) in 2018. He served as president until June 2024, when LULAC elected its chief of staff, Roman Palomares, as its new leader.
