= Mayor of Dallas =

Political office in Dallas, Texas, USA

- Seal of the City of Dallas

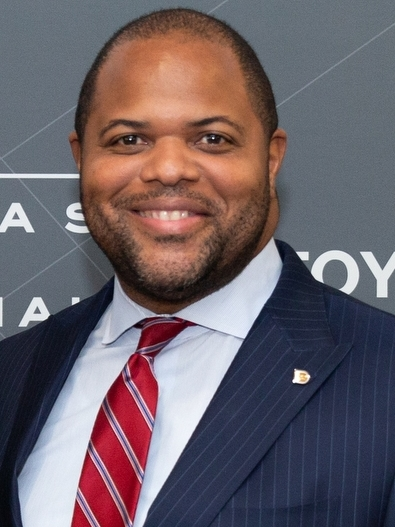
- Incumbent; Eric Johnson since 2019
- Style: The Honorable
- Residence: Dallas, Texas
- Term length: Four years, renewable once
- Inaugural holder: Dr. Samuel B. Pryor; 1856
- Formation: Dallas City Charter
- Salary: $80,000
- Website: City of Dallas - Mayor Eric Johnson

The Mayor of the City of Dallas is a member of the Dallas City Council and its presiding officer. The current mayor is Eric Johnson, who has served one term since 2019 and is the 60th mayor to serve in the position. Dallas operates under a city charter that designates the mayor as the official head of city government and a council-manager system where a city council-appointed city manager serves as the chief operating officer of the city.

== Duties and powers ==
The city of Dallas operates under a council-manager government type, putting the city of Dallas in a unique position as being one of the largest cities in the United States to utilize this municipal government structure. Unlike the more common form of government used by large cities known as the mayor-council government - where the mayor serves the chief-executive position of the city - the council-manager government of the city of Dallas gives the operational responsibility to the appointed City Manager. The mayor presides over city council meetings and official ceremonies and serves as a representative of the City of Dallas at the local, state, national, and international level. Likewise, it is not uncommon for mayors of the city of Dallas to simultaneously serve as members or heads of other committees while in office, further representing the interests of the people and city of Dallas in organizations and committees.

== History ==
The Office of Mayor was created with the formation of the Dallas City Charter in 1856, also providing for the mayor six aldermen, a treasurer, recorder and a constable. In the charter, it was stated that each office would be elected for a term of one year. In the reorganization of 1876, the mayor was elected to the office for a term of two years. The office was first filled in the election of 1856, in which Dr. Samuel B. Pryor defeated A. D. Rice for the position. A. D. Rice would run for office again and go on to serve as the 4th mayor of the city.

For much of the 19th century, mayors of the city of Dallas served for only one term. This precedence was broken at the end of Winship C. Connor's term, who – after serving three consecutive terms from 1887 to 1894 – would go on to be the city's longest consecutively serving mayor in the 19th century. His success was accredited to the development of the city's first water, power, and streetcar systems.

The municipal government of Dallas underwent two significant structural changes during its history. The first change was made in 1907 where the city voted to change from an alderman system to a commission form of government. Stephen J. Hay was the first mayor elected in this new form of government, demonstrating the success of the highly debated commission form of government and contributing to the development of White Rock Lake in response to a water shortage in 1910. The second major government change was made in 1930, altering the commission form of government to specifically be a council-manager form. The first mayor to serve following this change was Tom Bradford, a successful grocer who was a significant financial contributor to the Bradford Memorial Hospital for Babies, the preliminary institution to the Children's Medical Center Dallas. He died after suffering a major heart attack in 1932 and was the first mayor of Dallas to die in office.

Woodall Rodgers, serving two 4 year terms from 1939 to 1947, was mayor during World War II and served during the rampant manufacturing of aircraft and weapon goods in a rapidly industrializing Dallas. Rodgers oversaw the initial transformation of Dallas Love Field from a USAAF training ground to a commercial airport. He was also mayor when the Mercantile National Bank Building was constructed, which was the only skyscraper built in the United States during World War II and was the tallest building in the city of Dallas until the completion of Republic Center Tower I in 1954. The economic success brought by his contributions in office are commemorated by several namesakes throughout the city, most notably the Woodall Rodgers Freeway that passes underneath Klyde Warren Park and over the Trinity River along the Margaret Hunt Hill Bridge.

Earle Cabell served as 48th mayor from 1961 to 1964 and was mayor during the assassination of President John F. Kennedy in the city. In the wake of the assassination, Cabell was the target of multiple death threats and accusations of his involvement in the act.

The image of the city of Dallas was immensely tarnished by the assassination of the President, earning the moniker "City of Hate". Following Earle Cabell was Mayor J. Erik Jonsson who funded and supported the then proposed Dallas/Fort Worth International Airport. As mayor, he went on to support public works projects such as developing the new Dallas City Hall, the Dallas Convention Center, and the Dallas Central Library - the last of which is now named in his honor. He was followed by Wes Wise who went on to further improve the city's image during his three terms as mayor from 1971 to 1976. However, he stepped down to pursue a political career in United States Congress before the end of his third term. His pro-term mayoral successor, Adlene Harrison, stepped in and became acting mayor for the remainder of his term. She was the city's first female mayor, and the first female Jewish mayor in the United States. Although Dianne Feinstein is officially recognized as the first female Jewish mayor in the United States, Adlene Harrison's position as acting mayor predates Feinstein's start in office by almost two years; Adlene began serving as acting mayor on February 11, 1976, while Feinstein took office on December 4, 1978. Adlene would go on to serve as a member of several environmental committees and organizations after her short tenure, including the Environmental Protection Agency.

Ron Kirk was the first African-American mayor of the City of Dallas and served two terms from 1995 to 2002. As mayor, he led several efforts advocating for race equality and social welfare, mitigated tension between City Council and the Dallas School Board, advocated for economic development, and oversaw the construction of the American Airlines Center. He would later step down to pursue a seat in the US Senate, where he lost in the 2002 election to John Cornyn. After his defeat, he went on to become a lobbyist before being nominated and appointed by President Barack Obama to serve as United States Trade Representative from 2009 to 2013.

Laura Miller - the city's third female mayor, following Adlene Harrison and Annette Strauss - was instrumental in renegotiating the Wright Amendment to revise flight restrictions at Love Field Airport, as well as implementing a citywide smoking ban and an ordinance prohibiting sex-based discrimination. The following mayor Tom Leppert would impose a staunch crime-fighting policy, promote the economic development of a modern inland port, and was a vocal supporter of a controversial convention center hotel project during the Great Recession. He later vacated the office to pursue a US Senate campaign in 2012, of which he would place third in the runoff. Following the four-month incumbency of acting mayor Dwaine Caraway, mayor Mike Rawlings would be known for his vocal leadership during the 2014 Ebola outbreak, the 2016 shooting of Dallas police officers, and the removal of confederate monuments following the Charlottesville riots.

== List of mayors ==
This is the list of people who have held the office of mayor.

No.	Mayor	Took office	Left office	Tenure	Party (Note: Municipal elections in Texas are nonpartisan. The party affiliation of the mayor is listed here for informational purposes only.)	Election
1	Samuel B. Pryor (1816–1866)	1856	1857	1 year	Unknown	1856
2	John McClannahan Crockett (1816–1887); 1st time	1857	1858	1 year	Democratic	1857–1858
3	Isaac Naylor (1824–1885)	April 1858	August 1858	4 months	Unknown	Apr. 1858
4	A. D. Rice (1818–1869)	August 1858	1859	~5 months	Unknown	Aug. 1858
5	John McClannahan Crockett (1816–1887); 2nd time	1859	1861	2 years	Democratic	TBA
6	Fayette Smith (1830–1867)	1861	1861	<1 year	Unknown	TBA
7	Thomas E. Sherwood (1835–1897)	1861	1862	1 year	Unknown	TBA
Vacant due to the American Civil War		1862	1865			
8	John McClannahan Crockett (1816–1887); 3rd time	1865	1866	1 year	Democratic	TBA
9	John W. Lane (1835–1888)	1866	1866	<1 year	Democratic	App.
10	George W. Guess (c. 1822–1868)	1866	1868	2 years	Unknown	TBA
11	Benjamin Long (1838–1877); 1st time	1868	April 1870 (Note: Long resigned to return to Switzerland.)	2 years	Unknown	App.
12	Henry Ervay (c. 1834–1911)	1870	1872	2 years	Unknown	TBA
13	Benjamin Long (1838–1877); 2nd time	1872	1874	2 years	Unknown	TBA
14	William Lewis Cabell (1827–1911); 1st time	1874	1876	2 years	Democratic	1875
15	John D. Kerfoot (1835–1903)	1876	1877	1 year	Unknown	TBA
16	William Lewis Cabell (1827–1911); 2nd time	1877	1879	2 years	Democratic	TBA
17	J. M. Thurmond (1836–1882)	1879	1880	1 year	Unknown	TBA
18	John Jay Good (1827–1882)	1880	1881	1 year	Democratic	TBA
19	J. W. Crowdus (1828–1895)	1881	1883	2 years	Unknown	TBA
20	William Lewis Cabell (1827–1911); 3rd time	1883	1885	2 years	Democratic	TBA
21	John Henry Brown (1820–1895)	1885	1887	2 years	Unknown	TBA
22	Winship C. Connor (1848–1921)	1887	January 1894	7 years	Unknown	TBA
23	Bryan T. Barry (1851–1919); 1st time	1894	1895	1 year	Unknown	App.
23	Bryan T. Barry (1851–1919); 1st time	1894	1895	1 year	Unknown	1894
24	Franklin Pierce Holland (1852–1928)	1895	1897	2 years	Unknown	1895
25	Bryan T. Barry (1851–1919); 2nd time	1897	1898	1 year	Unknown	1897
26	John H. Traylor (1839–1925)	1898	1900	2 years	Unknown	TBA
27	Ben E. Cabell (1858–1931)	1900	1904	4 years	Unknown	TBA
28	Bryan T. Barry (1851–1919); 3rd time	1904	1906	2 years	Unknown	1904
29	Curtis P. Smith (1863–1919)	1906	1907	1 year	Democratic	1906
30	Stephen J. Hay (1864–1916)	1907	1911	4 years	Democratic	TBA
31	W. M. Holland (1875–1966)	1911	1915	4 years	Unknown	TBA
32	Henry D. Lindsley (1872–1938)	1915	1917	2 years	Democratic	TBA
33	Joe E. Lawther (1876–1943)	1917	1919	2 years	Democratic	TBA
34	Frank W. Wozencraft (1892–1966)	1919	1921	2 years	Democratic	TBA
35	Sawnie R. Aldredge (1890–1949)	1921	1923	2 years	Democratic	TBA
36	Louis Blaylock (1849–1932)	1923	1927	4 years	Unknown	1925
37	R. E. Burt (1862–1943)	1927	1929	2 years	Unknown	TBA
38	J. Waddy Tate (1870–1938)	1929	1931	2 years	Unknown	TBA
39	Tom Bradford (1869–1932)	1931	1932 (Note: Died in office.)	1 year	Unknown	TBA
40	Charles E. Turner (1886–1936)	1932	1935	3 years	Democratic	TBA
41	George Sergeant (1881–1971)	1935	1937	2 years	Democratic	TBA
42	George Sprague (1871–1963)	1937	1939	2 years	Democratic	TBA
43	Woodall Rodgers (1890–1961)	1939	1947	8 years	Unknown	TBA
44	J. R. Temple (1899–1980)	1947	1949	2 years	Democratic	TBA
45	Wallace H. Savage (1912–2000)	1949	1951	2 years	Democratic	TBA
46	Jean Baptiste Adoue (1884–1956)	1951	1953	2 years	Unknown	TBA
47	Robert L. Thornton (1880–1964)	1953	1961	8 years	Democratic	TBA
48	Earle Cabell (1906–1975)	May 1, 1961	February 3, 1964 (Note: Cabell resigned in order to run successfully for Texas's 5th congressional district.)	2 years, 278 days	Democratic	1961
48	Earle Cabell (1906–1975)	May 1, 1961	February 3, 1964	2 years, 278 days	Democratic	1963
49	J. Erik Jonsson (1901–1995)	1964	1971	7 years	Unknown	1964 special
49	J. Erik Jonsson (1901–1995)	1964	1971	7 years	Unknown	1965
50	Wes Wise (1928–2022)	1971	1976 (Note: Wise resigned in order to run unsuccessfully for Texas's 5th congressional district.)	5 years	Democratic	TBA
–	Adlene Harrison (1923–2022); Acting	February 11, 1976	1976	<1 year	Democratic	–
51	Robert Folsom (1927–2017)	1976	1981	5 years	Unknown	1976 special
52	Jack Wilson Evans (1922–1997)	1981	1983	2 years	Republican	TBA
53	Starke Taylor (1922–2014)	1983	1987	4 years	Republican	TBA
54	Annette Strauss (1924–1998)	May 4, 1987	December 2, 1991	4 years, 212 days	Unknown	TBA
55	Steve Bartlett (born 1947)	December 2, 1991	June 5, 1995	3 years, 185 days	Republican	TBA
56	Ron Kirk (born 1954)	June 5, 1995	2001 (Note: Kirk resigned in order to run unsuccessfully for United States Senator.)	6 years	Democratic	1995
56	Ron Kirk (born 1954)	June 5, 1995	2001	6 years	Democratic	1999
–	Mary Poss (TBA–TBA); Acting	2001	February 20, 2002	1 year	Unknown	–
57	Laura Miller (born 1958)	February 20, 2002	June 25, 2007	5 years, 125 days	Independent	2002 special
57	Laura Miller (born 1958)	February 20, 2002	June 25, 2007	5 years, 125 days	Independent	2003
58	Tom Leppert (born 1954)	June 25, 2007	February 25, 2011 (Note: Leppert resigned in order to run unsuccessfully for United States Senator.)	3 years, 245 days	Republican	2007
–	Dwaine Caraway (born 1952); Acting	February 26, 2011	June 26, 2011	120 days	Democratic	–
59	Mike Rawlings (born 1954)	June 27, 2011	June 17, 2019	7 years, 355 days	Democratic	2011
59	Mike Rawlings (born 1954)	June 27, 2011	June 17, 2019	7 years, 355 days	Democratic	2015
60	Eric Johnson (born 1975)	June 17, 2019	September 22, 2023 (Note: Johnson switched parties on September 22, 2023.)	7 years, 82 days	Democratic	2019
60	Eric Johnson (born 1975)	June 17, 2019	September 22, 2023	7 years, 82 days	Democratic	2023
60	Eric Johnson (born 1975)	September 22, 2023	Incumbent	7 years, 82 days	Republican	–

== See also ==
- History of Dallas
- List of mayors of the 50 largest cities in the United States
