= Charles E. Turner (politician) =

American politician

Charles Edward Turner

40th Mayor of Dallas
- In office 1932–1935
- Preceded by: Tom Bradford
- Succeeded by: George Sergeant

Personal details
- Born: September 13, 1886 Richardson, Texas, U.S.
- Died: March 5, 1936 (aged 49) Dallas, Texas, U.S.
- Resting place: Grove Hill Cemetery
- Party: Democratic
- Spouse: Valine Leachman
- Children: Betty Valine Turner
- Education: Adamson High School
- Occupation: Real estate

Military service
- Branch/service: United States Army
- Years of service: 1917–1919
- Rank: Lieutenant/Captain
- Unit: Co. A., 345th Machine Gun Battalion, 180th Brigade, 90th Division
- Commands: Co. B., 345th Machine Gun Battalion
- Battles/wars: World War I: St. Mihiel; Meuse-Argonne Offensive
- Discharge: Honorable

Charles Edward Turner (September 13, 1886 – March 5, 1936) was an American real estate developer and politician who served as mayor of Dallas from 1932 to 1935.

== Biography ==
Turner was born in Richardson, Texas to John Edward Turner and Mary E. Heffington. He married Valine Leachman, daughter of George Sidney Leachman and Margaret Eugenia Whaley. They had two children.

He began his career as a traveling salesman for a drug company. By 1914 he had become involved in real estate. In 1917 he enlisted and was commissioned as an officer in the 345th Machine Gun Battalion. He was given his own command in 1919 and saw action service in France. Returning to Dallas after the war, he continued making a living through real estate establishing his own company.

Prior to election as mayor, he served the city as a member of the city council and Mayor pro tem. As Mayor pro tem, he assumed the office of mayor upon the unexpected death of Tom Bradford and was subsequently elected for a term as mayor in his own right. He is credited with efforts to secure the construction of the railroad underpass for Elm-Main-Commerce (later known as the "Triple Underpass") and to have Dallas accepted as the location for the Texas Centennial celebration.

Mr. Turner, a 33˚ Mason, was active in the Masonic Lodge, Royal Arch Mason, Knights Templar, Scottish Rite, Hella Shrine and Royal Order of Jesters. He was also a member of the Dallas Chamber of Commerce, the Dallas Gun Club, the Idlewild Club, and was a fellow in the Dallas Historical Society.

Charles Turner died in Dallas, Texas and was interred at the Grove Hill Cemetery, Dallas.

Preceded by Tom Bradford	Mayors of Dallas; 1931–1932	Succeeded by George Sergeant
