= Gertrude Shelburne =

American activist, philanthropist and supporter of contraceptive rights

Gertrude Aldredge Shelburne
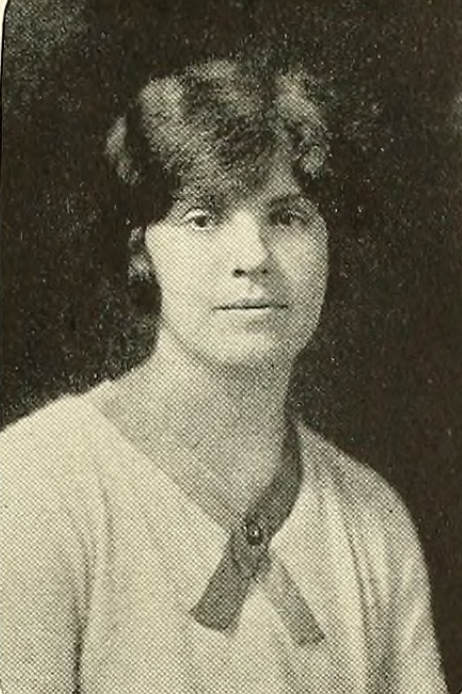
- Gertrude T. Aldredge, in the 1929 yearbook of Wellesley College
- Born: Gertrude Terrell Aldredge; 1907; Dallas, Texas, U.S.
- Died: 1993 (aged 85–86); Dallas, Texas, U.S.
- Occupation(s): Activist, philanthropist, and supporter of contraceptive rights
- Spouse: Samuel Ainslie Shelburne
- Parent(s): George Nathan Aldredge and Lilly Rowena (Munger) Aldredge

Gertrude Aldredge Shelburne (1907–1993) was an American activist, philanthropist, and supporter of contraceptive rights from Dallas, Texas. She was a member of the women's rights movement in Texas in the 1930s and 1940s.

In 1933, Shelburne joined forces with "an unlikely group of Dallas socialites drawn into the fledgling movement [now] known as the Planned Parenthood Federation." She and other Dallas-area women worked with Margaret Sanger to distribute contraceptives illicitly, with Sanger shipping diaphragms and condoms hidden in shirt boxes from New York for distribution to women in Texas. At the time, anti-contraception laws were the norm in the United States, and sharing information about contraception was prohibited by Comstock laws in many parts of the country. Shipping birth control across state lines was also against the law at the time.

In honor of her work to expand access to birth control in the Dallas area, Shelburne was made the eponym of a Greater Texas Planned Parenthood achievement award. Texans lost the right to abortion when the Supreme Court overturned Roe v. Wade and Texas criminalized abortion. However, the right to contraceptives and emergency contraception (Plan B) still stands, with costs usually covered by health insurance plans under the Affordable Care Act.

== Biography ==
Gertrude Terrell Aldredge (often referred to as Mrs. Samuel Shelburne) was born in Dallas, Texas in 1907, to George Nathan Aldredge and Lilly Rowena (Munger) Aldredge. She was born into a wealthy and politically connected Dallas family, whose members included lawyers, judges, and bankers, as well as Dallas mayor Sawnie R. Aldredge (1921–1923). Shelburne's father George Aldredge was the director of Texaco for 30 years, and her mother, Rena Munger, also from a wealthy Dallas family, was the daughter of a cotton gin business owner and niece of Robert S. Munger, an early adopter of exclusionary neighborhood developments by way of restrictive deeds.

She graduated from Wellesley College in 1929. She married Dr. Samuel Ainslie Shelburne. They lived in Dallas and had three children: Samuel Ainslie Shelburne, Jr. (1934–2021), George Aldredge Shelburne (b. 1939), and Alice Shelburne Neild (b. 1941). The family spent summers at the Chautauqua Institution, an educational summer camp for families in upstate New York. A life-long resident of Dallas, Shelburne died there in 1993 at the age of 85.
