= GESS =

Gess is a board game.

GESS or Gess may also refer to:

== People ==
- Edgar Gess (born 1954), Russian-German football coach and former player
- Robert Gess (born 1985), German judo player
- Germain Henri Hess or German Ivanovich Gess (1802–1850), Swiss-Russian chemist and doctor

== Schools ==
- Gan Eng Seng School, a school in Singapore
- German European School Singapore, a co-education school in Singapore

== See also ==
- Guess (disambiguation)
