= A. D. Rice =

American politician

Anderson Doniphan Rice

4th Mayor of Dallas
- In office 1858–1859
- Preceded by: Isaac Naylor
- Succeeded by: John McClannahan Crockett

Personal details
- Born: February 2, 1818
- Died: October 10, 1869 (aged 51)
- Resting place: Masonic Cemetery, Dallas, Texas
- Spouse(s): Ann Frances Russell, Zesiah Beeler Dillon
- Children: 3
- Occupation: Physician

Military service
- Allegiance: CSA
- Branch/service: Co. E, 3rd Regiment, Texas Cavalry (South Kansas-Texas Mounted Volunteers)
- Years of service: 1861-1864
- Rank: Surgeon, Captain

Anderson Doniphan Rice (1818 – October 10, 1869) was the third mayor of Dallas, Texas, from 1858 to 1859. A medical doctor by profession, he also served as county treasurer (1852–1854) and justice of Precinct No. 1 (1864–1866).

== Biography ==
Rice was born in Kentucky to Hudson M. Rice and Rachel Murphy He married Ann Frances Russell on June 24, 1852, in Dallas. After her death, he married Mrs. Zesiah Beeler Dillon on June 26, 1856, in Dallas. He and his second wife had three children: Hudson D. Rice, Lena V. Rice, and Harriet V. Rice.

When Dallas held its first election for mayor, both Samuel B. Pryor and Rice were on the ballot for the office. Pryor won that first election in 1856. In August 1858, Rice was elected the fourth mayor.

In 1861 Rice joined Company E of the Third Texas Cavalry as a surgeon, at the rank of either Captain or Private (sources differ). He died in 1869 and was buried in the Masonic Cemetery in Dallas. He was also a member of Tannehill Lodge No. 52, A. F. and A. M.
