= John W. Lane =

American politician

John William Lane

9th Mayor of Dallas
- In office 1866–1866
- Preceded by: John M. Crockett
- Succeeded by: George W. Guess

Personal details
- Born: February 22, 1835 Kentucky
- Died: September 16, 1888 (aged 53) Dallas, Texas
- Resting place: Pioneer Cemetery, Dallas, Texas
- Party: Democratic
- Spouse(s): Mary Elizabeth Crutchfield, L. Emma Thompson Hughes
- Children: Clarence C. Lane
- Occupation: Printer, state legislator, state senator, and mayor

Military service
- Allegiance: CSA
- Branch/service: Browder's Company, 18th Regt, Texas Volunteers
- Years of service: 1862–1863
- Rank: Private

John William Lane (February 22, 1835 – September 16, 1888) was a printer, state legislator, state senator, and mayor of Dallas, Texas.

== Biography ==
John W.Lane was born in Kentucky to Thomas H. and Elizabeth B. (Edwards) Lane. The family moved to Texas in 1849, settling in Fannin County. John Lane moved to Dallas in 1857. There, he married Betty Crutchfield, daughter of Thomas F. and Frances M. Crutchfield on January 5, 1860. The two had one son, Clarence C. Lane. Crutchfield died in January 1866. Lane married a second time to L. Emma Thompson Hughes of San Marcos, Texas, on January 8, 1868.

Lane was a printer by trade and was involved in publishing the Dallas Herald with his brother-in-law, John Swindell. During the Civil War, Lane enlisted as a 1st Sergeant in Browder's Company, 18th Regiment, Texas Volunteers. Additionally, Lane was a member of the Tannehill Lodge No. 52, A. F. and A. M., and the Benevolent and Protective Order of Elks (BPOE).

Lane's political career began after being appointed mayor of Dallas in 1866. He held this position for a brief time before resigning later that same year. As a state legislator, Lane is noted for ensuring that the Texas and Pacific Railroad route was laid through Dallas by adding a rider to an 1871 bill. This rider required that the railroad be laid within a mile of Browder Springs.
