= George Guess =

George Guess may refer to:

- Sequoyah (c. 1770–1843), Cherokee silversmith, named in English George Gist or George Guess
- George W. Guess (c. 1822–1868), mayor of Dallas, Texas, 1866–1868
