= Isaac Naylor =

American politician

Isaac C. Naylor
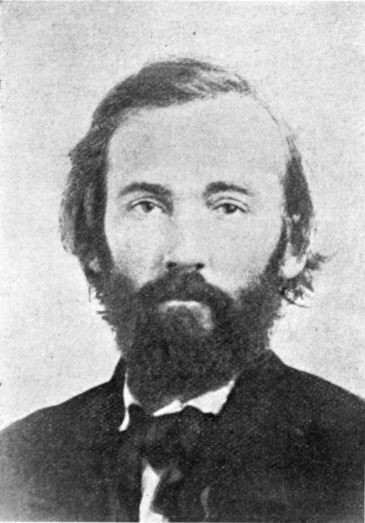

3rd Mayor of Dallas
- In office April 1858 – August 1858
- Preceded by: John McClannahan Crockett
- Succeeded by: A. D. Rice

Personal details
- Born: July 1, 1824 Morgan County, Ohio, U.S.
- Died: April 16, 1885 (aged 60) Galveston, Texas, U.S.
- Resting place: City Cemetery, Galveston, Texas
- Spouse: Henrietta Wood
- Children: 3
- Education: Marietta College
- Occupation: Lawyer, merchant

Isaac C. Naylor (1 Jul 1824 – 16 Apr 1885) was an attorney, postal clerk, merchant and bookkeeper. He served as mayor of Dallas, Texas from April 1858 to August 1858.

== Biography ==
Born in Morgan County, Ohio to Jonathan Naylor and Jane Marshall, Naylor had five siblings, William, Caroline, Reason, Harrison, and Rebecca. Isaac Naylor graduated from Marietta College in Ohio in 1851. Leaving Ohio, he traveled to Lavaca County, Texas, as a teacher in 1852. He operated the Select Academy in Galveston, Texas until 1856 and studied law with Sherwood & Goddard there. He was admitted to the bar in 1857.

He moved to Dallas, Texas to practice law. There he joined the Tannehill Lodge No. 52, A. F. and A. M. and served as its secretary.

Naylor was elected mayor of Dallas in June 1858. However, mere weeks later, Dallas citizens voted to adopt a new city charter. As a result of this change, a new mayoral election was held, and on August 2, 1858, Anderson Doniphan Rice was elected mayor.

While Naylor was mayor, he also served on the defense team of City Marshal Andrew M. Moore, who was charged with the murder of Alexander Cockrell. After a two-day trial in July 1858, Moore was declared not guilty of the crime.

Returning to Galveston, he married Henrietta Wood, daughter of Edward Stout Wood and Ann Outterside on 15 Sept 1858. During the Civil War he left his family in Galveston and moved to California and later New York because his sympathies were with the Union. Isaac Naylor returned to Galveston worked for his father-in-law as a clerk, bookkeeper, and merchant. In 1876, he was granted a license to practice law in the State of Florida for one year.

He died April 16, 1885, purportedly of an aneurism, and was interred in City Cemetery, Galveston, Texas. The 1880 census shows Henrietta and Isaac as having three sons named Edward, Isaac, and Charles.
