= Joe E. Lawther =

American politician

Joseph "Joe" Earl Lawther

33rd Mayor of Dallas
- In office 1917–1919
- Preceded by: Henry D. Lindsley
- Succeeded by: Frank W. Wozencraft

Personal details
- Born: February 11, 1876 Galveston, Texas
- Died: April 24, 1943 (aged 67) Dallas, Texas
- Resting place: Grove Hill Cemetery, Dallas, Texas
- Party: Democrat
- Spouse(s): Irma Bernice Enlow, Anna Florence Walden
- Children: Margaret Lawther, Lynn Vernon Lawther, Jo Ann Lawther

Joseph Earl Lawther (February 11, 1876 – April 24, 1943) was an American banker, civic leader, and mayor of Dallas, Texas, from 1917–1919.

== Biography ==
Lawther was born February 11, 1876, in Galveston, Texas, to Robert Ralston Lawther and Ellen E. Hoopes. He married Irma Bernice Enlow, daughter of James H. Enlow and Harriett Campbell, on October 22, 1895, in Dallas, Texas. They had two children: Margaret and Lynn V. After the death of his first wife in 1924, he married Anna Florence Walden, daughter of Charles Joe Walden and Eola Betty Tedford on June 8, 1925, in Jackson County, Missouri. They had one child: Jo Ann.

He entered the business world in the grain business, Lawther & Son, the firm of his father. He became president of Liberty State Bank and was responsible for its growth. He also served as president of Guardian Federal Savings & Loan Association. He assisted the Dallas Athletic Club to increase membership and decrease indebtedness. He was recognized for the improvement of White Rock Lake when a road around it was named for him.

He was a member of the Masonic Lodge, the Dallas Historical Society, and the Dallas Athletic Club.

On April 24, 1943, Joe Lawther died at Dallas, Texas. He was buried at Grove Hill Cemetery, Dallas, Texas.
