= W. M. Holland =

American politician (1875–1966)

William Meredith Holland

31st Mayor of Dallas
- In office 1911–1915
- Preceded by: Stephen J. Hay
- Succeeded by: Henry D. Lindsley

Personal details
- Born: March 29, 1875 Dallas, Texas
- Died: March 11, 1966 (aged 90) Dallas, Texas
- Resting place: Oakland Cemetery, Dallas
- Spouse: Frances Elnora Beggs
- Children: Virginia Saffel Holland, Sarah Holland, Kathryn Holland
- Education: University of Texas, George Washington University School of Law
- Occupation: Attorney, Judge

William Meredith Holland (March 29, 1875 – March 11, 1966), was an American attorney and judge, serving as mayor of Dallas in 1911–15.

== Biography ==
William Meredith Holland was born March 29, 1875, in Dallas, Texas to William Colter Holland and Sarah Jones Saffell. He married Frances Elnora Beggs, daughter of Hamilton T. Beggs Jr., and Virginia Dunnavant on 24 Jun 1909 in Dallas, Texas. They had three children: Virginia Saffel Holland, Sarah Holland, and Kathryn Holland.

He attended the University of Texas and Georgetown University Law School. He returned to Dallas where he practices law with the firm of Belsterling & Holland and later Holland, Bartlett, and Thornton. From 1907 to 1911, he served as a judge for the county court at law.

He was elected mayor in 1911; the first Dallas-born individual to become mayor of Dallas. During his term of service, a meningitis epidemic ravaged the city. The city built Parkland Hospital, a city hall building, White Rock Lake and the first sewage and water purification plants. After serving two terms as mayor, he returned to the practice of law.

In 1921 he was elected president of the Dallas Railway Company and was also vice-president of Mercantile Bank & Trust.

Among his many interests and endeavors was control of the Trinity River, building the Masonic Temple, a park system, removing the tracks from Pacific Avenue and Central Boulevard. He was a member of the Masonic Lodge and Hella Shrine Temple. William Holland died March 11, 1966, in Dallas, Texas and was interred at Oakland Cemetery, Dallas, Texas.
