= George Sergeant =

American politician

George William Sergeant

41st Mayor of Dallas
- In office 1935–1937
- Preceded by: Chas. E. Turner
- Succeeded by: George Sprague

Personal details
- Born: December 2, 1881 Mansfield, Texas, U.S.
- Died: August 26, 1971 (aged 89) Dallas, Texas, U.S.
- Resting place: Oak Cliff Cemetery
- Party: Democratic
- Spouse: Mary Marshall Brown
- Children: Mary Marshall Sergeant, George W. Sergeant, Jr.
- Education: University of Texas
- Occupation: Lawyer

George William Sergeant (December 2, 1881 – August 26, 1971) was an attorney and mayor of Dallas, Texas from 1932 to 1935.

== Biography ==
Sergeant was born on December 2, 1881, in Mansfield, Texas, to Gustavis A. Sergeant and Harriet (Hattie) P. Baldwin. He married Mary Marshall Brown, daughter of Dr. Horace M. Brown and Mary Elizabeth Rudd, on August 25, 1909, in Union, West Virginia. They had two children. Their first child, Mary Marshall Sergeant, died in infancy.

He attended school in Dallas and graduated from the University of Texas where he also received his law degree. In 1908 he began private practice in Dallas, but was soon appointed city judge. He served in a number of political positions. He was mayor during the time of the Texas Centennial Exposition held at Fair Park in Dallas, and has been referred to as "The Centennial Mayor.

He wrote a number of books including History of the First Presbyterian Church of Dallas, Texas (1943) and History of the Christian Church (1948). He served as deacon at Highland Park Presbyterian Church for 35 years becoming an elder in 1941.

Sergeant died August 26, 1971, in Dallas and was interred at the Oak Cliff Cemetery.
