= Henry Ervay =

American politician (1834–1911)

Henry Schley Ervay

12th Mayor of Dallas
- In office 1870–1872
- Appointed by: Edmund J. Davis
- Preceded by: Benjamin Long
- Succeeded by: Benjamin Long

Personal details
- Born: c. June 1, 1834 Elmira, New York
- Died: August 21, 1911 (aged 77) San Diego, California
- Resting place: Oakland Cemetery, Dallas, Texas U.S.
- Spouse: Maria Louise Hickman (m. 1862)
- Children: 4
- Occupation: Capitalist, politician

Henry Schley Ervay (c. June 1, 1834 – August 21, 1911), merchant, capitalist, was mayor of Dallas (1870–1872), and continued to be involved in the affairs of the city by serving as alderman (1873–1882).

== Biography ==
Henry S. Ervay was born to Jacob Ervay and Sophia Schley in Elmira, New York in 1834. He arrived in Texas in 1857. He married Maria Louise Hickman, daughter of James P. Hickman and Mary Bronaugh on 20 May 1862. The couple had four children: Jimmie Ervay, Harry Ervay, Henry S. Ervay Jr., and Maude E. Ervay. The first two children died in infancy.
Henry Ervay was engaged in several enterprises as a young man including surveying and exploring in the American and Canadian west and working for the Butterfield Overland Mail Company. He and other Texans volunteered to serve with General William Walker in the war for freedom in Nicaragua.
He was appointed mayor by Governor Edmund J. Davis in 1870. Even though Ervay was elected by the citizens in 1871, General Joseph J. Reynolds, head of the federal military, ordered his removal and the appointment of Dr. J. W. Haynes. Ervay refused and was jailed but later released on order of the State Supreme Court.
He left Texas with his family for Cripple Creek Colorado around 1888 to engage in mining enterprises. He later moved to San Diego, California
Ervay died in San Diego in 1911 and was interred at the Oakland Cemetery in Dallas, Texas. He was a member of the Tannehill Lodge No. 52, A. F. and A. M. which conducted the funeral services.
