= Benjamin Long =

American politician (1838–1877)

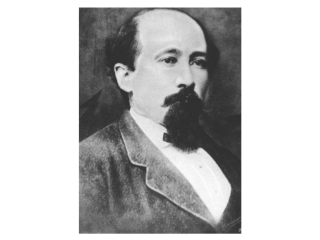

11th and 13th Mayor of Dallas
- In office 1868–1870
- Preceded by: George W. Guess
- Succeeded by: Henry Ervay
- In office 1872–1874
- Preceded by: Henry Ervay
- Succeeded by: William Lewis Cabell

Personal details
- Born: Benjamin Lang; March 7, 1838 Zürich, Switzerland
- Died: June 23, 1877 (aged 39) Dallas, Texas, United States
- Resting place: Greenwood Cemetery, Dallas, Texas
- Spouse: Eugenia De Vleschondere (m. 1862)
- Children: Benjamin Long, Jr., Annie Long, Mary Long, Eugenia Long, Lucia Long
- Occupation: Grocer

Benjamin Long (March 7, 1838 – June 23, 1877) was a Swiss-born grocer and immigrant to Texas, where he served as Mayor of Dallas between 1868–70 and 1872–74.

== Biography ==
Benjamin Long was born March 7, 1838, in Zürich, Switzerland. He married Eugenia De Vleschondere, an immigrant from Belgium, on 25 March 1862 at the home of Jacob Nussbaumer in Dallas, Texas. They had one son and four daughters.

He emigrated to join of the La Réunion Colony, a utopian community which failed in part because too many of the settlers were skilled craftsmen and not enough were farmers. Many of the settlers moved into Dallas after the colony was dissolved. It was then that Lang changed the spelling of his name to Long.

Because he supported the Union against slavery, during the American Civil War Lang moved to Mexico to avoid becoming involved in the hostilities. Following the Civil War, he was appointed mayor of Dallas by the military government in Austin for the term 1868–1870. He became a naturalized citizen in 1869. He resigned as mayor in April 1870 to return to Switzerland where he encouraged immigration to Texas. He was re-elected for a two-year term 1872–1874, but was defeated for re-election in 1874.

Long provided funds for the right of way for the Texas and Pacific Railway and helped to secure land for the construction of the depot during his second term in office. He also built an artificial recreation lake, Long's Lake. He was a member of the Tannehill Lodge #52 A.F. and A.M.

On June 23, 1877, Benjamin Long was killed by a drunk patron of a Swiss saloon on Austin and Wood streets over a minor disagreement. He was interred at Trinity Cemetery, now known as Greenwood, leaving behind a wife and four young children.
