= Laura Miller (politician) =

American politician from Texas

57th Mayor of Dallas
- In office February 20, 2002 – June 25, 2007
- Preceded by: Ron Kirk
- Succeeded by: Tom Leppert

Personal details
- Born: November 18, 1958 (age 67) Baltimore, Maryland, U.S.
- Party: Independent
- Spouse: Steven Wolens
- Education: University of Wisconsin–Madison (BA)

Laura Miller (born November 18, 1958) is an American journalist and politician who served as the 57th mayor of Dallas, Texas from 2002 through 2007. She decided not to run for re-election in 2007. She was the third woman to serve as mayor of Dallas.

== Early life ==
Laura Miller was born in Baltimore, Maryland. She attended the University of Wisconsin–Madison, where she graduated with a degree in political science and journalism in 1980.

== Career ==
=== Journalism ===
Miller spent the early part of her career as a journalist working as a staff writer for The Miami Herald and The Dallas Morning News and then as a columnist for the New York Daily News and the now-defunct Dallas Times Herald. In 1991, Miller became an investigative reporter for the Dallas Observer and then a columnist for D Magazine.

=== Politics ===
In 1998, Miller was elected to the Dallas City Council representing Oak Cliff and southwest Dallas. In 2002, Miller was elected as Mayor of Dallas, replacing Ron Kirk who left the post to run for the United States Senate position vacated by retiring Texas Senator Phil Gramm.

She fought for and won approval of a strengthened smoking ban, an ordinance prohibiting discrimination on the basis of sexual orientation, a revamped public housing system, a $23 million homeless assistance center, major changes to the city's Trinity River Corridor improvement plan and a taxpayer-funded downtown redevelopment effort.

She participated in an agreement between American Airlines, the City of Fort Worth, DFW Airport and Southwest Airlines to revise the federal flight restrictions at Love Field Airport, which involved: replacing geographic limitations on Love Field service with: flight caps determined by a limitation on the number of gates allowed at Love Field, restrictions on the rights of any new air carrier to service North Texas via any airport other than DFW Airport, and banning international commercial air travel at Love Field. The unique agreement and resulting oligopoly required an exemption from federal antitrust laws, which Miller also successfully helped obtain.

David Levey, executive vice president for Forest City Enterprises, credited Miller for reviving a $250 million deal to renovate downtown's long vacant Mercantile National Bank Building.

During her term, the Dallas Cowboys announced plans to build Cowboys Stadium and many citizens hoped it would be built in Dallas. The city and the Dallas Cowboys, however, failed to reach a deal and the stadium was built in Arlington.

She announced parade plans for the Dallas Mavericks championship in 2006, prior to the Mavericks losing four straight games and ultimately the NBA championship to the Miami Heat in six games.

Miller was succeeded in office by Republican Tom Leppert.

In May 2019. Miller made an unsuccessful run for Dallas City Council to represent District 13.

=== Environmental efforts ===
Laura Miller serves as Director of Projects, Texas, for Summit Power Group, a Seattle-based developer of wind, solar and gas-fired power plants. Summit was recently selected by the U.S. Department of Energy to receive a $350 million cost-sharing award to build the world’s first IGCC (Integrated Gasification Combined Cycle) clean-coal power plant located near Odessa, Texas. The low-emissions project, called the Texas Clean Energy Project, is projected to capture just under 3 million tons a year of carbon dioxide, which will be used for enhanced oil recovery in the West Texas Permian Basin.

Miller's other environmental accomplishments included the formation and co-leading (with former Houston mayor Bill White) of the Texas Clean Air Cities Coalition, made up of 36 cities, counties and school districts in Texas that opposed the construction of 11 coal plants (which would have used older technology) by TXU, a Dallas-based energy company. Ultimately, TXU (now called Energy Future Holdings) officially suspended its plans to build eight of the eleven plants. As a result of these efforts, Miller won a 2008 Climate Protection Award from the Environmental Protection Agency for this nationally-recognized effort, which has been memorialized in a documentary film, produced and narrated by Robert Redford, and entitled Fighting Goliath: The Texas Coal Wars.

== Personal life ==
Miller is married to Dallas attorney and former Texas State Representative Steven D. Wolens. They have three children.

In 1998, Miller was diagnosed with breast cancer. She underwent chemotherapy and radiation treatments which effectively eradicated the cancer.

She is Jewish.

== See also ==
- 2002 Dallas mayoral special election
- 2003 Dallas mayoral election

Political offices
Preceded by Ron Kirk	Mayors of Dallas; 2002–2007	Succeeded by Tom Leppert
