= Curtis P. Smith =

American politician

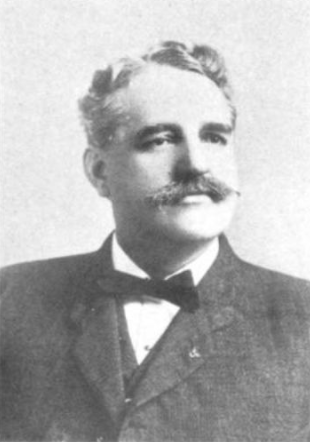

29th Mayor of Dallas
- In office 1906–1907
- Preceded by: Bryan T. Barry
- Succeeded by: Stephen J. Hay

Personal details
- Born: October 21, 1863 Vincennes, Indiana
- Died: February 20, 1919 (aged 55) Dallas, Texas
- Resting place: Paris Kentucky Cemetery
- Party: Democrat
- Spouse: Anna Elizabeth Renick
- Children: William Renick Smith
- Education: DePauw University, University of Cincinnati
- Occupation: Lawyer, civic leader

Curtis Pendleton Smith (October 21, 1863 – February 20, 1919) was an American attorney and civic leader who was mayor of Dallas, Texas from 1906–1907.

== Biography ==
Curtis Pendleton Smith was born October 21, 1863, in Vincennes, Indiana, to Dr. Hubbard Madison Smith and Nannie Willis Pendleton. He married Anna Elizabeth Renick, daughter of William H and Martha Renick on October 9, 1891, in Bourbon County, Kentucky. They had one son: William Renick Smith

C. P. Smith came to Dallas in 1887 where he practice law. His civic involvement included service on the school board, as assistant city attorney, as a member of the board of aldermen, and as judge of the city court. He resigned the judgeship to run for mayor in 1906. During his term as office modern street paving began.

He wrote Texas notarial manual and form book: A handy manual for notaries public, conveyancers, banks, business men and attorneys in the state of Texas and other books. He was a Mason, Odd Fellow and a member of Delta Tau Delta.

He died February 20, 1919, in Dallas, Texas and was interred at the Paris Cemetery, Paris, Kentucky.
