= Philip Pryor =

American Politician

Philip Pryor (December 22, 1777 – June 17, 1825) was an American planter, soldier and politician.

== War of 1812 ==
Pryor served as Captain of a cavalry company with the 1st Regiment (Byrne's), Virginia Militia, during the War of 1812 and participated in the Battle of Hampton on June 25, 1813. A letter from Major Stapelton Crutchfield to Governor of Virginia James Barbour, recounting the circumstances of the battle and Captain Pryor's actions, was read to the Virginia House of Delegates on June 25, 1813.

== Political career ==
Pryor served in the Virginia House of Delegates from 1808 to 1814. He served on the Committee of Propositions and Grievances and the Committee of Claims. On January 17, 1811, Pryor voted in favor of a non-binding resolution instructing Virginia's U.S. congressional delegation to oppose the renewal of the charter of the First Bank of the United States.

== Marriage and family ==
On July 5, 1802, Pryor married Susan Cordle Wilkes (September 2, 1786 - May 22, 1842), daughter of Burwell Bassett Wilkes and Susan Cordle, Brunswick County, Virginia. Susan and Philip Pryor had seven children together. He was the father of Dr. Samuel B. Pryor (August 19, 1820 - October 18, 1866), the first mayor of Dallas, Texas (1856), and Dr. Charles R. Pryor (November 2, 1822 - August 26, 1882), who was editor of the Dallas Herald and Secretary of State of the Confederate state of Texas during the American Civil War.

== Early life and ancestry ==
Pryor was born in 1777, the son of John Pryor of Amelia County, Virginia (died 1785) and Ann Bland (1735-1785). He was a grandson of Richard Bland (1710-1776) and Ann Poythress (1712-1758), and both his maternal and paternal ancestors were descended from Jamestown, Virginia colonists. His nephew was U.S. Senator Luke Pryor (1820-1900), son of Luke Pryor. Other prominent Virginia ancestors included Richard Bland (burgess), Theodorick Bland of Westover, Richard Bennett (governor) and William Randolph.
