= Tom Bradford =

American politician (1869–1932)

Thomas Leonard Bradford (February 13, 1869 – August 22, 1932) was Mayor of Dallas, Texas, from 1931 until his death by heart attack in 1932.

Tom Bradford was born in Port Hudson, Louisiana to the Rev. Harrison Bradford and Elizabeth Shelmire Bradford. Bradford graduated from Centenary College of Louisiana before moving to Dallas in 1887. Bradford opened a grocery store in the Oak Cliff neighborhood in 1888. By 1912 Bradford had an ownership interest in six grocery stores, and that year he acquired an interest in Southwestern Life Insurance Company. In 1929, he donated $100,000 to build the Bradford Memorial Hospital for Babies, the present Children's Medical Center of Dallas. As the first Dallas mayor elected under the council-manager system of municipal government adopted on October 10, 1930, Bradford was first elected to the eight-member council by Dallas voters, and then elected mayor by his fellow councilmen.

Preceded by J. Waddy Tate	Mayors of Dallas; 1931–1932	Succeeded by Charles E. Turner
