= Howard Lincoln Hodgkins =

American physicist and academic administrator

Howard Lincoln Hodgkins (June 23, 1862, in Elgin, Illinois – February 13, 1931) is best known as the ad interim president of the George Washington University from 1921 until 1923.

== Early life and education ==
He was born in Elgin, Illinois, on June 23, 1862, to David and Harriet Shears Hodgkins. As a member of the very first class to graduate from the Washington High School, Howard Lincoln Hodgkins went on to attend the George Washington University's Columbian College in the fall of 1878. Upon his graduation in the class of 1883, Howard Lincoln Hodgkins received a number of successful degrees including a Bachelor of Arts, a Master of Arts, a Doctorate of Philosophy, and an Honorary Doctorate of Science.

== Career at George Washington University ==
Hodgkins served George Washington University's Columbian College for more than forty-eight years. Over the course of this time he served the University as a tutor (in 1883), an assistant professor (in 1884), a professor of physics (beginning in 1887), Dean of the Scientific School (from 1898 until 1903), Dean of the University (in 1901 and 1903), Dean of the College of Engineering (beginning in 1905) and President (in 1921).

On February 28, 1887, the George Washington University's Alumni Association underwent some major construction. Upon its reorganization, Howard Lincoln Hodgkins, better known as Dean Hodgkins, became the Secretary of the Alumni Association. As the only permanent officer of the Alumni Association, Hodgkins' job was to keep the living alumni interested in the school. He created various activities and outings for alumni to participate in, in support of the University, and in 1892 Hodgkins prepared a historical catalogue of the University that covered the George Washington University's first seventy years. Hodgkins served the Alumni Association for more than twenty-five years.

In addition to all his work at the George Washington University, Howard Lincoln Hodgkins was involved in a number of “extracurricular activities. He was initiated into the DC Alpha chapter of Phi Kappa Psi Fraternity on campus which is still present today. He worked with the Washington Society of Engineers, served as a fellow of the American Association for the Advancement of Science, was a member of the American Physical Society, the American mathematical society, and the Washington Philosophical Society in addition to serving as the special computer of the National Almanac Office of the Navy Department from 1882 until 1892.

Hodgkins died on February 13, 1931, in Washington DC at age 69.
