= Stephen J. Hay =

American politician

Stephen John Hay
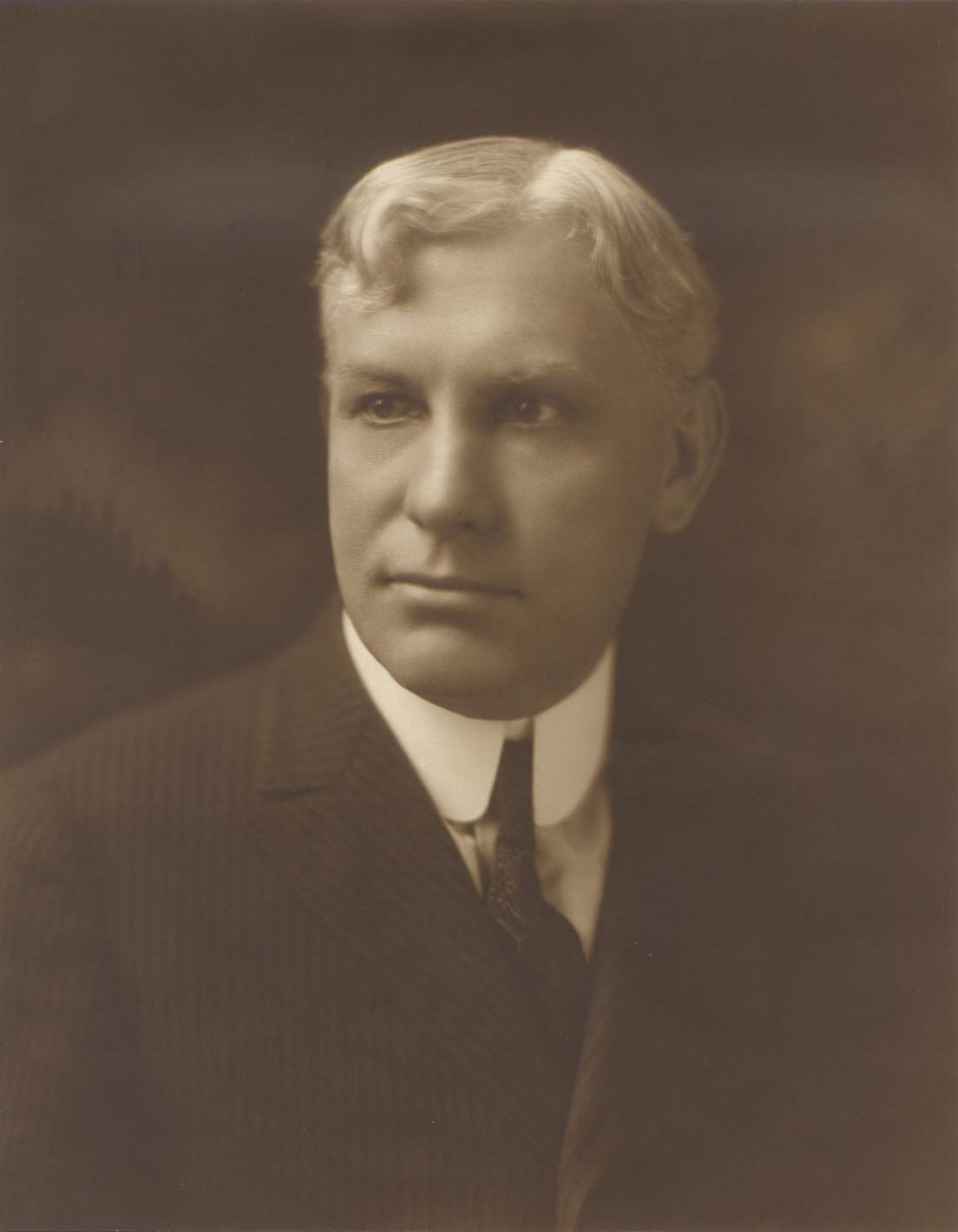

30th Mayor of Dallas
- In office 1907–1911
- Preceded by: Curtis P. Smith
- Succeeded by: W. M. Holland

Personal details
- Born: October 5, 1864 Griffin, Georgia, U.S.
- Died: February 29, 1916 (aged 51) Dallas, Texas, U.S.
- Resting place: Grove Hill Memorial Park, Dallas, Texas
- Party: Democratic
- Spouse: Mary N. Oxford
- Children: 3

Stephen John Hay (October 5, 1864 – February 29, 1916) was the first mayor of Dallas, Texas under the commission form of government.

== Biography ==
Born in Griffin, Georgia, Hay left for Atlanta as a young man to work in a department store and take business classes at night. At the age of 23 he moved to Dallas and was elected to his first public office in 1899 as a member of the school board. He served four terms and two years as its president before resigning in 1907 to run for Mayor of Dallas. Hay served two terms as mayor from 1907 to 1911. His largest accomplishments were demonstrating that a commission form of city government could work well and launching the White Rock Reservoir plan. After leaving office he served as president of the Dallas Trust and Savings Bank, director of The Texas Paper Company, and on the City Health Board. Hay was also one of the founders of Trinity Methodist Church in Dallas, where he served two years as president of the board of stewards for the church and often preached lay sermons. He died suddenly of meningitis at his home on McKinney Avenue in Dallas at 51 years of age.

Political offices
Preceded by Curtis P. Smith	Mayor of Dallas; 1907–1911	Succeeded by W. M. Holland
