= Albert Black =

American businessman (born 1959)

- Born: July 24, 1959 (age 67); Dallas, Texas, U.S.
- Education: SMU Cox School of Business MBA; University of Texas at Dallas
- Title: President & CEO of On-Target Supplies & Logistics, ReadyToWork and OTSL Charities
- Spouse: Gwyneith Black
- Children: 3
- Website: www.otsl.com

Albert C. Black Jr. (born July 24, 1959) is an American businessman who was CEO and chairman of On Target Supplies and Logistics, a company he founded in 1982. Black was the first African American chairman of the Dallas Regional Chamber in Dallas, Texas. He traveled to 16 countries on joint trade missions with former Dallas Mayor Ron Kirk. He was chairman of the Baylor Health Care System, helping to establish the Baylor Diabetes Health & Wellness Institute. He is the current chairman of the Charles Sammons Cancer Center and the Dallas Housing Authority.

He has received three Texas Instruments Supplier Excellence Awards and is a recipient of the 30th Congressional District Award for outstanding achievement in the field of business.

== Early life ==
Black was born in 1959, the youngest of seven children and raised in the Frazier Courts housing projects in South Dallas. As a doorman at a hotel in downtown Dallas, his father, Albert Black Sr., came to know influential city business leaders. After work, Black Sr. would return home and tell Black Jr., “I want my children to be like those leaders running the city and improving the lives of others.” Hearing these words were Black's initial inspiration to become an entrepreneur, nonprofit volunteer, and civic leader.

Black began his business career at age ten, when he and his friends borrowed a lawn mower and started Best Friends Lawn Service, charging $2 per lawn, and eventually becoming "the first in the neighborhood to get a power mower."

He attended high school in the Dallas Independent School District and after graduation, he continued his studies at the University of Texas at Dallas, graduating with a Bachelor's Degree of General Studies with a focus on business and political science. Following the completion of his studies at UTD, he enrolled at Southern Methodist University where he received an M.B.A. from the Cox School of Business.

== On-Target Supplies & Logistics ==
Black co-founded On-Target Supplies & Logistics in 1982 as a janitorial supplies distribution company. When the business was slow to take off, Albert got a night job in the information systems department at Texas Utilities in order to fund his company. For ten years he worked at On Target from 7:30 AM to 4:30 PM, then went to his night job from 5:00 PM to 2:00 AM. He guided the company from a two-person start-up to a growing operation with over 300 employees that has expanded to offer outsourced logistic solutions, supply chain management, and value-added reselling. On-Target's headquarters are located in southern Dallas with additional logistics operations throughout Dallas / Fort Worth, Sherman, Texas, Houston, Texas, and Tucson, Arizona.

=== ReadyToWork ===
In 2006, Black launched ReadyToWork, On-Target's professional development service. ReadyToWork offers staffing, career training, work readiness, available training space and training resources to its clients. ReadyToWork has trained more than 2,200 people.

=== OTSL Charities ===
In 2006, Black established On-Target's social service arm, OTSL Charities, which donates time and resources to local area communities. OTSL Charities participates with other local charities to give back to the community, including helping Habitat for Humanity build houses, raising money for the March of Dimes and volunteering with at-risk students at the Texans Can! Academy.

== Volunteerism and civic duty ==
In addition to being an entrepreneur, Black is also active in public service, civic duty and social volunteerism.

He was a Trustee and became Chairman of the Baylor Health Care System of Dallas in 2010. During his tenure, he helped build The Baylor Diabetes Health & Wellness Institute in his home neighborhood of Frazier Courts, where three times as many residents were dying as a result of diabetes than anywhere else in America. Continuing more than two decades of finance and operations consulting with the system, he currently serves as Chairman of the Charles A. Sammons Cancer Center at Baylor Scott and White Health. He was on the advisory board of Southern Methodist University Cox School of Business, and a Regent for Baylor University-Waco as well as his current position of Chairman of the Dallas Housing Authority.

Black has previously been on various boards including: Dallas Black Chamber of Commerce, Chase Bank of Texas, Hankamer School of Business at Baylor University, and Paul Quinn College. In 1997, former Governor George W. Bush appointed Black to serve on the Board of Regents of Texas Southern University in Houston. In 2000, Black served as the first African-American Chairman of the Greater Dallas Chamber of Commerce's board of directors.

Black was the Treasurer for Texas State Senator Royce West, Judge John Creuzot, and Mayor Tom Leppert of Dallas.

Black is a member of Omega Psi Phi, a national public service fraternity.

He is a member of New Hope Baptist Church. His wife of 35 years, Gwyneith, is the Executive Director of OTSL Charities and devotes her time to philanthropic causes. His children are Oliver Victor Black, Albert C. Black III (Tre’) and Cora René Black. The family enjoys traveling, hiking, and spending time together on Lake Cypress Springs.

== Mayoral campaign ==
Black announced his candidacy for the May 2019 Dallas mayoral election on July 18, 2018. On May 4, 2019, he lost in the nonpartisan blanket primary and failed to advanced to the runoff election.
