= Guessing Game (disambiguation) =

A guessing game is a game in which the object is to guess some kind of information, such as a word, a phrase, a title, or the location of an object.

Guessing Game or The Guessing Game may also refer to:

- The Guessing Game, an album by the band Cathedral
- "Guessing Game", a song by Elzhi from The Preface (2008)
- "Guessing Game", an episode of the television series Teletubbies
- "Guessing Game", a season 2 episode of Simon & Simon
- Guessing Game, the 1993 winner of the Queen's Cup (SAJC)
- "Guessing Game", a series 4 episode of The Bill
- "Guessing Games", a song from the 1982 Hall & Oates album H2O

== See also ==
- "Our Guessing Game", a song by the Moody Blues from Every Good Boy Deserves Favour (1971)
