= Sawnie R. Aldredge =

American politician (1890–1949)

35th Mayor of Dallas
- In office 1921–1923
- Preceded by: Frank W. Wozencraft
- Succeeded by: Louis Blaylock

Personal details
- Born: November 13, 1890 Dallas, Texas, U.S.
- Died: May 13, 1949 (aged 58) Dallas, Texas, U.S.
- Resting place: Hillcrest Mausoleum, Dallas, Texas
- Party: Democratic
- Spouse: Mary Ellen Batts
- Children: 2
- Education: Cornell University; University of Texas Law School
- Occupation: Attorney

Military service
- Allegiance: United States
- Branch/service: United States Army
- Years of service: 1917–1919
- Rank: Second lieutenant
- Unit: Signal Corps
- Battles/wars: World War I

Sawnie Robertson Aldredge (November 13, 1890 – May 13, 1949), attorney and judge, was mayor of Dallas from 1921 to 1923.

== Biography ==
Aldredge was born November 13, 1890, in Dallas, Texas, to Judge George Nathan Aldredge and Betty Warren Hearne. He married Mary Ellen Batts, daughter of Judge Robert Lynn Batts and Harriet Fiquet Boak on January 14, 1915, in Austin, Texas. They had two children: Sawnie R. Aldredge Jr. and Mary Lynn Aldredge. Aldredge's niece, Gertrude Aldredge Shelburne, was an early women's rights and birth control activist in Dallas.

He attended Southwestern University, Cornell University and University of Texas School of Law. He was admitted to the Texas bar in 1914. He was associated with Thompson, Knight, Baker & Harris; Allen & Flanary, which eventually became Aldredge, Shults & Madden. During the First World War, he was stationed at Kelly Field, Texas, and St. Maixent Field, France.

He ran for mayor with the support of the Citizens' Association, defeating William E. Talbot, nominee of the Democratic party and the Independent Voters' League. Trinity Heights was annexed to the city of Dallas during his administration. This was the largest single addition to the city since Oak Cliff was annexed in 1904. He sought to annex Highland Park to the city and to establish a municipal golf course. He did not run for a second term.

Sawnie R. Aldredge died May 13, 1949, in Dallas, Texas, and was interred at Hillcrest Mausoleum, Dallas, Texas.
