= Louis Blaylock =

Mayor of Dallas (1923–1927)

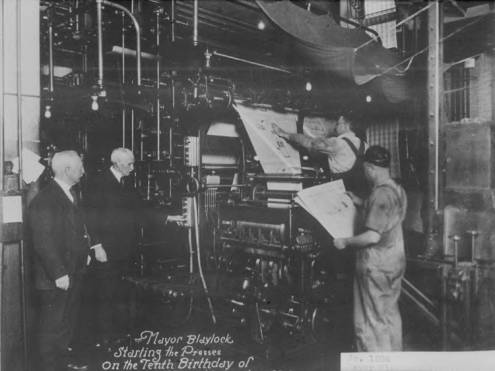
- Blaylock starting presses on the 10th birthday of the Dallas Journal

36th Mayor of Dallas
- In office 1923–1927
- Preceded by: Sawnie R. Aldredge
- Succeeded by: R. E. Burt

Personal details
- Born: October 21, 1849 Sevier County, Arkansas, U.S.
- Died: December 4, 1932 (aged 83) Dallas, Texas, U.S.
- Resting place: Oakland Cemetery, Dallas
- Spouse: Georgia Darton (m. 1871)
- Occupation: Civil leader

Louis Blaylock (October 21, 1849, in Sevier County, Arkansas – December 4, 1932) was a publisher, civil leader of Dallas, Texas, and its mayor from 1923 to 1927.

== Early life and career ==
Blaylock was born in Sevier County, Arkansas, to Willis and Irene (Gibbs) Blaylock. Three years after his birth, the family relocated, by covered wagon down the old Preston trail to a one-room cabin outside Fort Hamilton. But, owing to his father's illness and physical decline, the family relocated to Austin in 1852. His father died in 1856 leaving his mother with four children to support. In 1866, at age 14, Blaylock was taken under the tutorship of Sam Houston and was put in charge of the 100-mile path between Burnett and Austin with the Pony Express. At the time, only teenage boys were employed by the Pony Express. Simultaneously, Blaylock's career began as a typesetter for the Austin Weekly Gazette. His mother landed the job for him as a "printer's devil" so he could help support the family. He worked after school and on the weekends at both jobs until his school was closed because of the Civil War. Soon after, Texas Christian Advocate, a Methodist newspaper now known as the United Methodist Reporter, hired him as a typesetter and expert hand printer. He relocated to Galveston for this job. On June 1, 1871, at age 22, he married Georgia Darton, the daughter of Mathias W. Darton, a shipping and merchant man of great wealth and influence from Boston, Massachusetts. Mr. and Mrs. Blaylock eventually had five children and were married for 58 years until her death in 1929.

After several years of working in Galveston, Blaylock and William A. Shaw (his half-brother) took over the Texas Christian Advocate paper, meaning he was in control of its workings. By 1876, the paper had a circulation rate of 13,000 civilians, considered by many during that time to be the largest circulation of a contemporary newspaper in Texas. By 1887, the paper claimed a circulation of 18,000. The two men moved their company and families to Dallas, Texas. That same year Blaylock and Shaw formed the Blaylock Publishing Company, located on Jackson Street. Mr. and Mrs. Blaylock built their home down the street from the printing company at 2028 Jackson Street, Dallas, and raised their five children there.

== Politics ==
In politics, Mr. Blaylock was a stalwart supporter of the principles and policies of the Democratic Party. He was essentially broad-minded and was widely regarded for his Christian charity and civic minded principals.

He was regarded as a "dyed-in-the-wool" Democrat. As well as working for the newspaper, Blaylock was the commissioner of police from 1903 to 1906, for the Dallas Police Department between 1901 and 1904, as well as serving as both police and fire commissioner between 1913 and 1915. He performed these jobs as a gift to the people of Dallas, declining a salary. After serving as Park Commissioner, he served as City Administer and Finance Commissioner from 1919 until 1923. He served as Finance Commissioner at the time of his mayoral nomination in 1923.

January 31, 1923, the executive committee of the Dallas Citizens Association, a nonpartisan group which felt strongly that municipal government should not consist of citizens who had allegiance to a national or special party (the Klan in this case), dubbed the ticket for their nominee the "Blaylock Ticket," and the "Harmony Ticket". Much to their surprise, the Democratic party also nominated Blaylock on a full Democratic ticket. The candidates were announced Feb 7, 1923. Blaylock was puzzled as to what to do, and chose to accept the nomination from his party. The association withdrew his name and substituted Marvin E. Martin. The "harmony" quickly vanished and a full-fledged mudslinging campaign got underway. The Dallas Citizens Association painted the Democratic candidates as either members of the Klan, or sympathetic with the Klan through the use of a questionnaire distributed to candidates(1). As Finance Commissioner, Blaylock continually stated in his speeches, that "We are trying to conduct a decent campaign with out mud slinging. I feel the Democratic candidates all have the best interest of all the people Dallas at heart and will administer the government for all the people with out any special favors for any"(2). April 3 brought the public to the polls. On April 4, the headlines read: "Entire Democratic Ticket Headed by Blaylock is swept into Office"(3). Mayor-elect Blaylock had won by a 2–1 majority. "It was a landslide; an avalanche; a Texas Tornado that swept the opposition into a slough of utter defeat. Old man Blaylock ran like a greyhound after a jackrabbit"(4).

Prior to and during his mayorship, he supported and nurtured the first Dallas city plan developed by George Kessler in 1910.

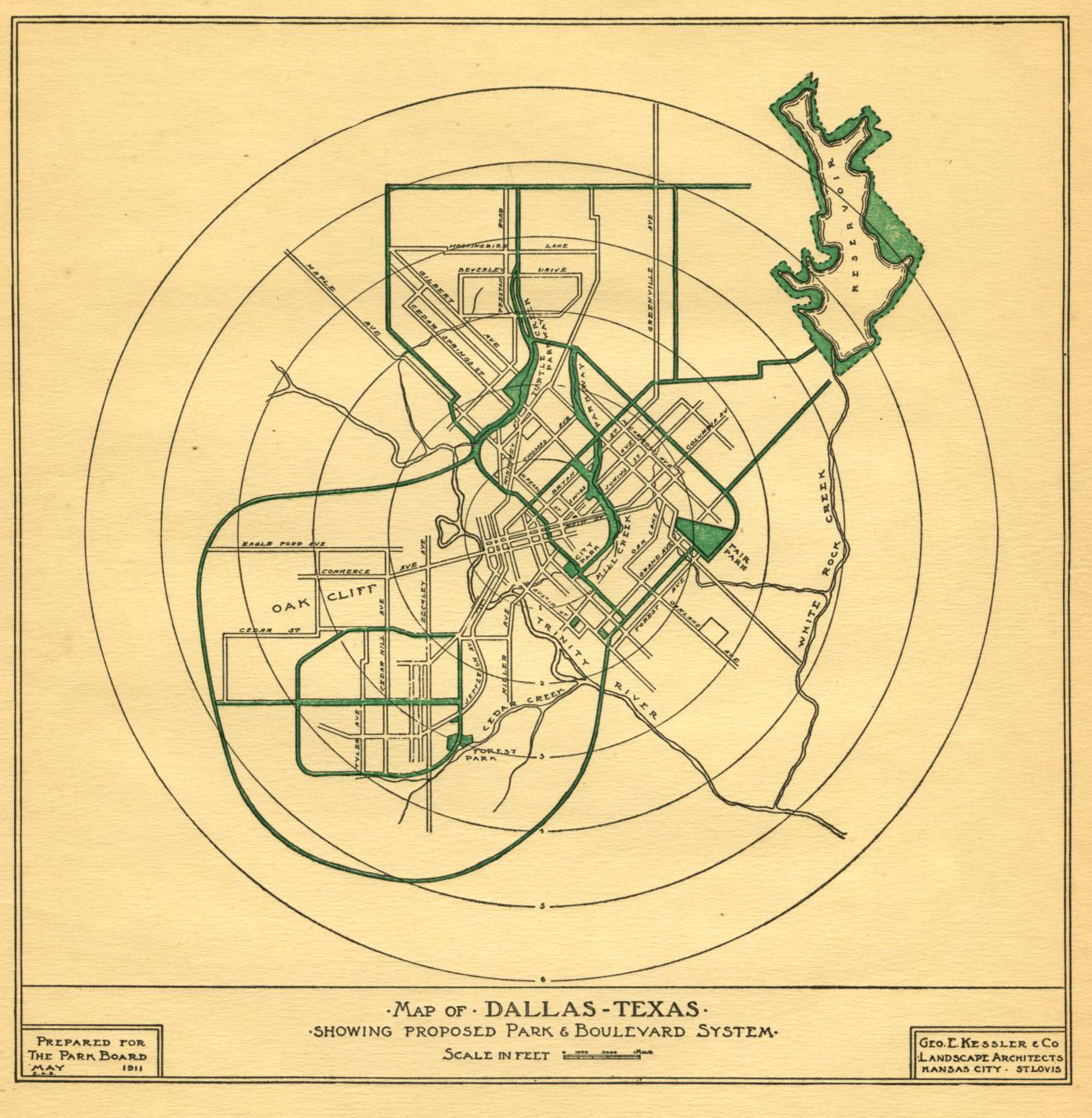
Kessler Map

The articles in order are: Article 1. Origin of the Plan; Article 2. Early Efforts at Civic Development; Article 3. Kessler Plan for All of the city; Article 4. The Trinity River Levee Plan; Article 5. Belt Line Railway Proposal; Article 6. Pacific Avenue Track Removal; Article 7. Street Widening and Extension; Article 8. The Supplemental Plan of 1920; As Implemented over 15 years; Article 9. The Central Avenue Boulevard; Article 10. Lamar Street Trafficway; Article 11. St. Paul Street Improvements; Article 12. The Cadiz-Williams Proposal; Article 13. Downtown Street Extensions; Article 14. Oak Cliff Trafficways; Article 15. Beauty to Follow Utility; Article 16. Cooperation in Suburban Development; Article 17. Park and Parkway Plans; Article 18. Large vs. Small Parks; Article 19. Playgrounds Considered; Article 20. Inner and Outer Boulevards; Article 21. The Mill Creek Parkway; Article 22. Outer Parkway and White Rock Plans; Article 23. Financing the Plan.

Blaylock left the newspaper company in 1922 after working for and managing it for fifty-six years of his life. Since he was seventy-four at the time of his election, he was soon nicknamed "Daddy" Blaylock. While in office, he was noted for greeting every gorgeous movie star, festival queen, or other prominent female who visited Dallas, with a kiss as an official welcome to the city. Post-mayorship, he continued his role as official greater and was rolled in his wheelchair to great notable visitors to Dallas with an official peck on the cheek. Blaylock was also known as one of the most able and conservative mayors in the city's history. Blaylock was the president of the board of trustees of the First Methodist Episcopal Church, South, in Dallas, as well as a building committee member for the church.

== Affiliations ==
He was a time-honored Mason with the distinction of having received the maximum degree (33°) of the Ancient and Accepted Scottish Rite. His maximum York bite affiliation was with the Dallas Commandery, No. 6, Knights Templar: he was a member of the Ancient Arabic, Nights of Constantine, and the Order of Nobles of the Mystic Shrine. At a meeting in March, 1903, a group of members of the Lodge of Perfection and the Chapter of Rose Croix met in their hall on Commerce Street and organized "The Dallas Scottish Rite Cathedral Association".

At that time he was named a founding board member and worked to build the nationally recognized Scottish Rite Cathedral, located at 500 S. Harwood in Dallas, Texas. He has been identified as president of the building committee for the Masonic temple of Dallas and the building chair for the Pretoria Building on main street. During his mayorship, he supported and encouraged the donation of many acres of land to the city for use to build both large and small parks, including: the Dallas Zoo, Reverchon Park, Kessler Park, and Fair Park. He created water sources for recreation (White Rock Lake) and drinking (the Garza Dam). He installed drinking fountains for animals and citizens and restorative health measures including a public bath house. He created the means and building funds for the auditorium at Fair Park without city bonds to do so and invested in business for the growth of Dallas.

He was a named investor and supporter of the New Century Cotton Mill, the only African American cotton gin in the South.

Blaylock was a primary shareholder of the Dallas Morning News.

In 1919, he was a founding member of "The Boneheads," an all-male organization founded by 57 disgruntled business leaders (the number coming from Heinz 57) who were fed up with luncheon clubs. As one story goes, after enduring one such assembly, a peeved businessman turned to his colleague and remarked, "I have heard that speech so many times I could recite it." In an effort to debunk the eager-beaver business mentality, they decided to start a lunch club that had no purpose at all. Their motto was, "To learn more and more about less and less, until eventually we shall know everything about nothing."

Blaylock died on December 4, 1932, at age 83 and was buried in Oakland Cemetery, Dallas.
