= Henry D. Lindsley =

American businessman

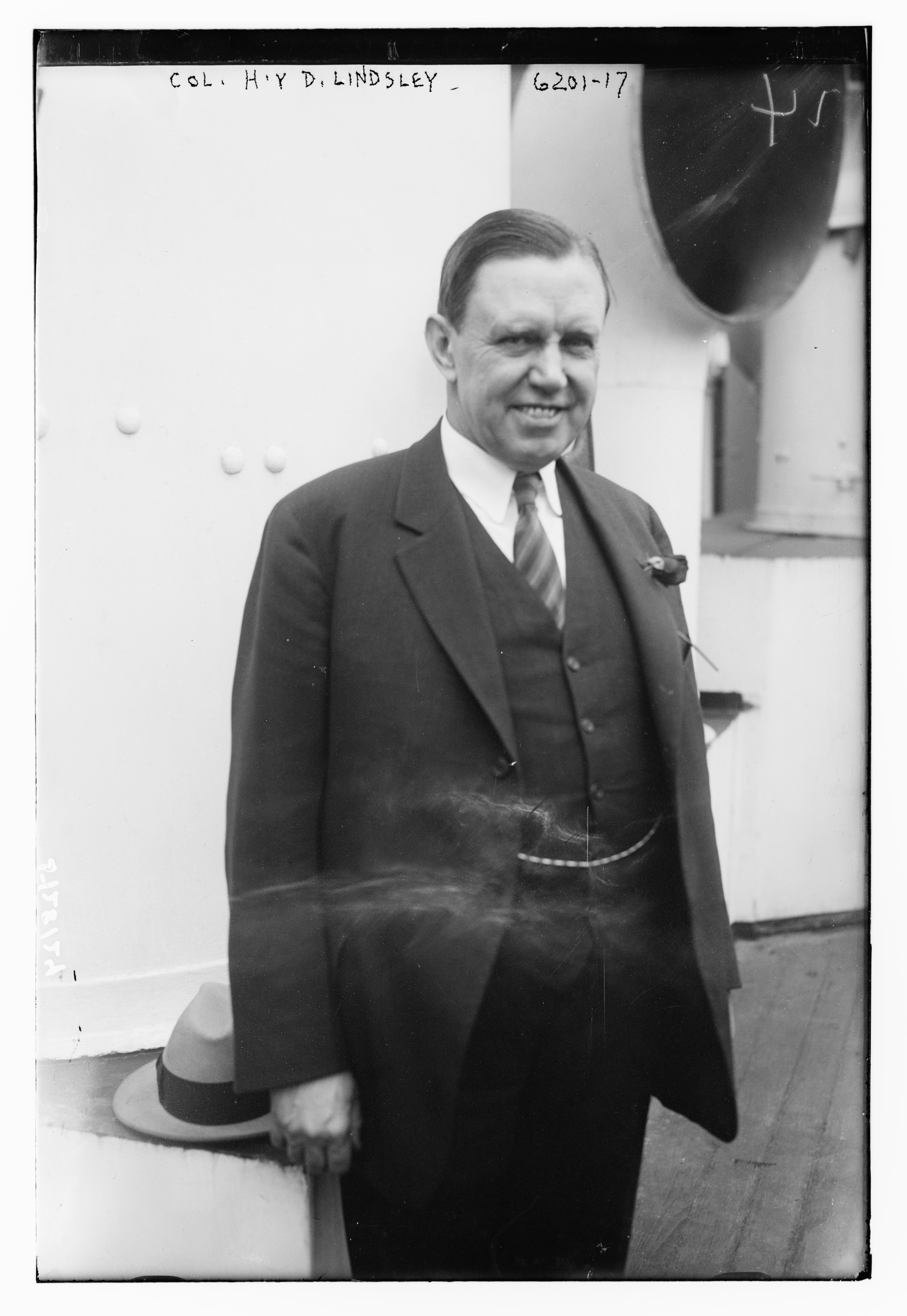

32nd Mayor of Dallas
- In office 1915–1917
- Preceded by: William M. Holland
- Succeeded by: Joe E. Lawther

Personal details
- Born: Henry Dickinson Lindsley; February 29, 1872 Nashville, Tennessee, U.S.
- Died: November 18, 1938 (aged 66) Dallas, Texas, U.S.
- Resting place: Arlington National Cemetery
- Party: Democratic
- Spouses: Ruth H. Bower; Marguerite Berwick
- Children: 3
- Education: Cumberland University
- Occupation: Businessman

Military service
- Allegiance: United States
- Branch/service: United States Army
- Years of service: 1917–1919
- Rank: Colonel
- Unit: War Risk Insurance Bureau, France
- Battles/wars: World War I: Defensive Sector
- Awards: Distinguished Service Medal; Officer of the Legion of Honor (France); Commander of the Order of the Crown (Belgium)

Henry Dickinson Lindsley (February 28, 1872 – November 18, 1938) was an American businessman who served as the 32nd Mayor of Dallas from 1915 to 1917.

== Early life and career ==
Henry Dickinson Lindsley was born on February 28, 1872, in Nashville, Tennessee, to Philip and Louise Gundry (née Dickinson) Lindsley. He studied law at Cumberland University in Lebanon, Tennessee, and was admitted to the Texas bar in 1893.

Lindsley bought a controlling interest in Southwestern Life Insurance; served on the boards of Dallas Bank & Trust Company, City National Bank, U.S. Bond & Mortgage Co., and Dallas Title & Guaranty. He worked with others in Dallas to establish Southern Methodist University and obtain funding from the Rockefeller Foundation. With Stephen J. Hay, then mayor, and Charles Bolanz, he approached Adolphus Busch to build a hotel. The Busch Estate invested in Dallas by building the Adolphus Hotel. He bought and subdivided large tracts in North Texas

=== World War I ===
Lindsley was commissioned a colonel, serving as Director of the War Risk Insurance Bureau in France. General John J. Pershing awarded him the Distinguished Service Medal for his services as Director of the War Risk Insurance Bureau in France. For his service there, Lindsley was awarded the Commander of the Belgian Order of the Crown by King Albert of Belgium and the Officer of the French Legion of Honor of Marshal Ferdinand Foch.

=== The American Legion ===
Along with Theodore Roosevelt, Jr., Lindsley helped organize The American Legion and was honored by the organization with the honorary title, Past National Commander.

== Death ==
Lindsley died November 18, 1938, in Dallas and was interred at Arlington National Cemetery.

== Personal life ==
Lindsley's father was a judge and his maternal uncle, Jacob M. Dickinson, the Secretary of War in President Taft's Cabinet. He married Ruth H. Bower, daughter of Edwin G. Bower, Emily Virginia Scott on December 3, 1892, in Dallas. They had two children: Henry D., Jr. and Kathryn. Lindsley later married Marguerite Berwick, daughter of Oscar E. Berwick and Emma Knauss on May 14, 1936, in Dallas. His grandson, Henry D. Lindsley III, married the granddaughter of Franklin D. Roosevelt, Ruth Chandler Roosevelt.

== See also ==
- List of members of the American Legion

Political offices
Preceded by William M. Holland	Mayor of Dallas; 1915–1917	Succeeded by Joe E. Lawther
