= John McClannahan Crockett =

American politician (1816–1887)

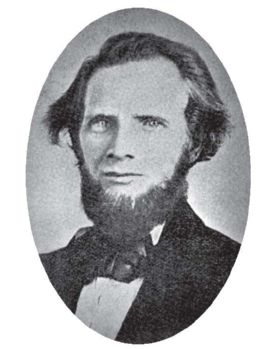

8th Lieutenant Governor of Texas
- In office November 7, 1861 – November 5, 1863
- Governor: Francis Lubbock
- Preceded by: Edward Clark
- Succeeded by: Fletcher Stockdale

2nd, 5th, & 8th Mayor of Dallas
- In office 1865–1866
- Preceded by: No mayor due to the American Civil War
- Succeeded by: John W. Lane
- In office 1859–1861
- Preceded by: A. D. Rice
- Succeeded by: Fayette Smith
- In office 1857–1858
- Preceded by: Samuel B. Pryor
- Succeeded by: Isaac Naylor

Personal details
- Born: December 26, 1816; Lancaster, South Carolina, U.S.
- Died: August 4, 1887 (aged 70); Dallas, Texas, U.S.
- Resting place: Old Masonic Cemetery, Dallas
- Political party: Democratic
- Profession: Lawyer, politician

John McClannahan Crockett (December 26, 1816 – August 4, 1887) was an American politician and lawyer who served as the mayor of Dallas for three nonconsecutive terms between 1857 and 1866 as the eighth lieutenant governor of Texas from 1861 to 1863. A South Carolina native, Crockett moved to Texas in 1847.

== Early life ==
Crockett was born at Lancaster, South Carolina, on December 26, 1816. He studied at Franklin Academy in Lancaster. Before studying law, he was involved in a business career. He married Catherine W. Polk on March 17, 1837. He started studying law in 1841, and in 1844, he was granted a license to practice law.

== Life in Texas ==
Crockett and his wife, Catherine, moved to the city of Paris, Texas in 1847. In 1848 they moved to the Dallas area. William H. Hord, the brother-in-law of Crockett, was county judge there. Crockett started practicing law in the Dallas area, and also became deputy county clerk there. He became commissioner of the Mercer colony in 1850. In 1851 he became state representative from the Dallas area. He was involved in multiple court trials, and was a law partner of John Jay Good in the first half of the 1850s.

Dallas was granted a town charter on February 2, 1856, by the Texas legislature. Crockett was elected as the second mayor of Dallas in 1857, serving for three non-consecutive terms; his last was 1865–1866.

Crockett became meteorological observer for the Smithsonian Institution in Dallas in 1859. He was elected as the eighth Lieutenant Governor of Texas in 1861. He left the lieutenant governor's office in 1863. Despite a supportive constituency, he refused to enter the race for the governorship of Texas. He returned to the Dallas area to become superintendent of the Confederate arms factory in Lancaster, Texas.

After the war, he incorporated the Dallas Grain, Elevator, and Flouring Company in 1872. In 1875, he became a charter member of the executive committee of the Dallas Pioneers Association.

== Death ==
Crockett died on August 4, 1887; he was interred at the Old Masonic Cemetery, Dallas.

Political offices
Preceded by Edward Clark	Lieutenant Governor of Texas; 1861–1863	Succeeded by Fletcher Stockdale
Preceded by Samuel B. Pryor	Mayor of Dallas; 1857-1858	Succeeded by Isaac Naylor
