= John D. Kerfoot =

American politician (1835–1903)

John David Kerfoot

15th Mayor of Dallas
- In office 1876–1877
- Preceded by: William L. Cabell
- Succeeded by: William L. Cabell

Personal details
- Born: July 1, 1835 Clarke County, Virginia, U.S.
- Died: March 31, 1903 (aged 67) Mullins Crossing, Tom Green County, Texas, U.S.
- Resting place: Oak Cliff Cemetery, Dallas, Texas
- Spouse: Mary Eliza Carr (m. 1867)
- Children: 8
- Education: University of Virginia
- Occupation: Lawyer, Justice of the Peace, Insurance

Military service
- Allegiance: CSA
- Branch/service: Co. D, 6th Virginia Cavalry
- Rank: Private

John David Kerfoot (July 1, 1835 – March 31, 1903) was an American politician, attorney, and businessman who served as the 15th mayor of Dallas from 1876 to 1877.

== Biography ==
John D. Kerfoot was born July 1, 1835, in Clarke County, Virginia, to Franklin James Kerfoot and Harriet E. Webb. He married Harriet E. Carr on April 30, 1867, in Fauquier County, Virginia. The couple had eight children who were called May, Katherine, Randolf, Virginia, Ruth and Helen (twins), and Emily.

Kerfoot attended both Columbian College and the University of Virginia in the mid-1850s. At Columbian (now George Washington University), Kerfoot was a member of the Enosinian Society, a debate and literary society founded in 1822, where he held the offices of both recording secretary and vice president. By 1860, the US census lists him as a lawyer in Dallas, Texas, and as having a law practice with T. M. Waller. When the American Civil War began, he returned to Virginia and enlisted in the Confederate States Army on August 24, 1861, at Camp Fairfax. He served as a private in Company D of the 6th Regiment of the Virginia Cavalry. At the end of the war, he was paroled at Winchester, Virginia, on April 21, 1865.

He remained in Virginia after the war’s end, and on April 30, 1867, he married his cousin Mary Eliza Carr, daughter of John and Emily Carr. Privately published by members of the family., 1948.</ref> The couple then moved to Dallas where Kerfoot opened a law practice with John M. Crockett. Kerfoot was elected Judge of the Dallas county court in 1870 by a vote of 172 to 125 against John C. Seydel. He was re-elected in 1873. In 1875, Kerfoot was elected mayor of Dallas. During his administration, two significant changes in Dallas government occurred via a new city charter. First, the term of the mayor was extended from one to two years. Second, the offices of treasurer, engineer, and city attorney were no longer be elected by popular vote; they would be appointed.

After his time as mayor, Kerfoot turned to insurance and was one of the first to do so in Dallas. In 1874, his business partner was W. R. Ault; in 1876, the company name was J. D. Kerfoot and Company, general insurance agents, and had its offices in the San Jacinto Hotel. The 1883 Dallas City Directory lists Kerfoot as the head of the firm of Kerfoot, Hereford, and McGrain (John B. Hereford, William McGrain; it was located on Elm Street and one of the first fire insurance companies in Dallas). By 1890, he was a partner in Kerfoot & Spears, and the 1894 Dallas City Directory shows a renewal of the J. D. Kerfoot and Company, both fire insurance companies. J. D. Kerfoot and Company was located at 109 North Poydras in downtown Dallas.

The Kerfoot family moved from Dallas to a ranch in Mullen, Texas, near San Angelo. Harriett died in 1891, and Kerfoot himself had a stroke in 1895 and never fully recovered from the resulting paralysis. He died on March 31, 1903. The couple is buried in Oak Cliff Cemetery in Dallas.
