= George W. Guess =

American politician

Mayor George William Guess

10th Mayor of Dallas
- In office 1866–1868
- Preceded by: John W. Lane
- Succeeded by: Benjamin Long

Personal details
- Born: c. 1822 North Carolina, U.S.
- Died: July 18, 1868 Memphis, Tennessee, U.S.
- Resting place: Elmwood Cemetery, Memphis Tennessee
- Spouse: Mary "Molly" Brown Miller
- Children: George W. Guess, Jr.
- Occupation: Lawyer

Military service
- Allegiance: CSA
- Branch/service: Capt Good's Co., Dallas Light Artillery Company, Co. A 31st Regiment of the Texas Volunteer Cavalry
- Years of service: 1861–1865
- Rank: Lt. Colonel

George William Guess (c. 1822 – 18 July 1868) was mayor of Dallas, Texas (1866–1868).

== Biography ==
George W. Guess was born in North Carolina in about 1822. He arrived in Texas about 1853 to practice law. He married Mary (Molly) Brown Miller, daughter of William Brown Miller and Minerva Barnes December 4, 1856. The couple had one child, George W. Guess, Jr. who died as an infant. Mary Miller Guess died in 1861.

On March 12, 1862, Guess enlisted in Dallas as a private in Capt. William W. Peak's Company, Hawpe's Regiment Texas Cavalry providing his own horse. This company became Co. A 31st Regiment of the Texas Volunteer Cavalry. On May 14, 1862, he was commissioned a Lt. Col. He was accused by the Confederates of speculating in cotton in 1862. He was captured by Maj. Gen. Dana's forces near Morganza, Louisiana September 29, 1863 and was imprisoned in New Orleans. In December 1864 he was transferred to Ship Island, Mississippi, a Union prison for Confederate soldiers.

George Guess was elected mayor in 1866 after John W. Lane resigned and served until Benjamin Long was appointed by federal military government. He was a member of the Tannehill Lodge No. 52, A. F. and A. M. and served as Worshipful Master in 1860, 1861, 1862 and 1867.

G. W. Guess died on the steamer "Victor" from sunstroke in the Mississippi River near Memphis, Tennessee on July 18, 1868. Guess had traveled to Memphis to bring back the body of his wife's brother-in-law, Frank Roberson, but instead was interred beside him at Elmwood Cemetery.
