= Samuel B. Pryor =

American politician

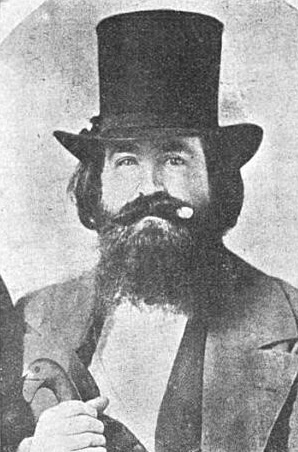

1st Mayor of Dallas
- In office 1856–1857
- Preceded by: Office established
- Succeeded by: John McClannahan Crockett

Personal details
- Born: August 12, 1816 Lawrenceville, Brunswick, Virginia
- Died: October 18, 1866 (aged 50)
- Resting place: Pioneer Park Cemetery, Dallas, Texas
- Spouse: Anna Mariah Powell
- Children: Ashton G. Pryor, E. R. Pryor, Charles R. Pryor, Pocahontas Pryor, Samuel B. Pryor, William L. Pryor
- Education: Hampden Sydney College
- Occupation: Physician

Samuel B. Pryor (1816–1866) was the first mayor of Dallas, Texas.

After Dallas was granted a town charter on February 2, 1856 by the Texas legislature, Pryor became the first mayor of Dallas. He led a town government which had six aldermen, a treasurer-recorder, and a constable. He was the first mayor of Dallas, Texas from 1856 to 1857.

Born in Brunswick County, Virginia to Philip Pryor and Susan C. Wilkes, his Pryor lineage is traceable through a line of affluent colonial Virginians. His father was counted as a head of household on the 1810 and 1820 Census Presumably his father died before 1830 when his mother was then counted as head of household. Samuel Pryor would have been in his early teens at the time of his father's death.

Pryor was in the first graduating class of cadets from the Virginia Military Institute in 1839-1840. He attended Hampden–Sydney College, graduating in 1844. During the American Civil War, he served in the Confederate States Army.

Samuel B. Pryor lived a life of public service. He was a physician. Before serving as mayor, he served as the Court Clerk in Dallas County during 1848-1849.

Political offices
New office	Mayor of Dallas; 1856–1857	Succeeded by John McClannahan Crockett
