= City Manager of Dallas =

Chief administrative officer in Texas, US

The city manager of Dallas is the chief administrative officer of Dallas, Texas, appointed by the Dallas City Council under the city's council–manager form of government. Nineteen people have held the office since John N. Edy became the first city manager in 1931, two of them in an acting capacity.

== History ==
Dallas adopted the council–manager form in 1930 after a campaign to replace the commission form under which the city had operated since 1907. Advocates drafted a new charter, but Mayor J. Waddy Tate twice refused to put it before voters. Its supporters then organized as the Citizens Charter Association, recast the proposal as thirty-nine amendments to the existing 1907 charter, gathered the petition signatures needed to force a referendum, and won approval on October 10, 1930. The association went on to become a standing political organization that proposed and campaigned for council slates at each election; its first slate, nine business and professional men, took every seat in 1931, and its candidates held a council majority from 1931 to 1975 with the single exception of the years 1935–1939.

The first council appointed John North Edy as city manager. Edy's tight budget policies made him a divisive figure, and his push to raise revenue quickly to cover the costs of the 1936 Texas Centennial Exposition was especially resented; an opposing slate swept the 1935 election. The association regained control in 1939 and, working closely with the Dallas Citizens Council formed in 1937, dominated city government for the next several decades, during which the manager answered to a council chosen almost entirely from its slates.

The at-large system that underpinned this arrangement ended in January 1975, when a federal district court, in a suit brought by Al Lipscomb, found it unconstitutional for diluting minority voting strength. The 1975 election was the first held with eight single-member districts and three at-large seats, including the mayor. The Citizens Charter Association lost its majority that year and dissolved in 1977.

== Duties and powers ==
The mayor and the 14 council members elected from single-member districts serve as the equivalent of a board of directors: they set the city's agenda, adopt policies and ordinances, and appoint the city manager, as well as the city attorney, city auditor and city secretary. The city manager is the city's chief administrator and the council's chief advisor, overseeing city operations with an executive team of assistant city managers. Dallas is one of four of the ten largest cities in the United States to use the council–manager form, along with Phoenix, San Antonio and San Jose.

City managers of Dallas
No.	City manager	Term
1	John North Edy	1931–1935
2	Hal Moseley	1935–1939
3	L. B. Houston (acting)	1939
4	James W. Aston	1939–1943
5	V. R. Smitham (acting while Aston was on military leave)	1942–1947
6	Roderic B. Thomas	1947–1950
7	Charles C. Ford	1950–1952
8	Elgin E. Crull	1952–1966
9	W. S. McDonald	1966–1973
10	George Schrader	1973–1981
11	Charles Anderson	1981–1986
12	Richard Knight Jr.	1986–1990
13	Jan Hart	1990–1993
14	John Ware	1993–1998
15	Teodoro Benavides	1998–2004
16	Mary Suhm	2005–2013
17	A. C. Gonzalez	2014–2017
18	T. C. Broadnax	2017–2024
19	Kimberly Bizor Tolbert	2024–present
