= Richard Knight =

Richard Knight may refer to:

- Richard Knight (MP) (by 1518–1555 or later), English MP for Chichester
- Sir Richard Knight (1639–1679), English MP for Lymington
- Richard Knight (footballer) (born 1979), English footballer
- Richard Knight (1659–1745), of Downton, Herefordshire, ironmaster
- Richard Payne Knight (1750–1824), MP, classical scholar, connoisseur, archaeologist and numismatist
- Richard of the Knight Brothers, a soul music duo
- Richard Knight (cricketer) (1892–1960), English cricketer
- Richard Knight (rower) (born 1928), British Olympic rower
- Richard Knight Jr. (1945–2021), city manager of Dallas
- Richard Knight (speedway rider) (born 1959), former motorcycle speedway rider

== See also ==
- Dick Knight (disambiguation)
