= Bartholomew Plan (Dallas) =

1943–1945 master plan for Dallas, Texas

The Bartholomew Plan was a comprehensive master plan for Dallas, Texas, prepared between 1943 and 1945 by the St. Louis planning firm of Harland Bartholomew and Associates. Never formally adopted by the Dallas City Council, it nonetheless shaped a large 1945 bond program, a round of annexations, and the city's postwar housing and planning efforts.

== Background ==
Dallas's previous master plan, the 1912 Kessler Plan, was implemented only in pieces. In 1927 the Ulrickson Committee recommended a new comprehensive plan and considered Bartholomew's firm for the job, but nothing was commissioned, and planning efforts stalled amid local division and the Great Depression. After the Citizens Charter Association, backed by the Dallas Citizens Council, won the 1939 council election and installed J. Woodall Rodgers as mayor, civic leaders revived the push for a new plan.

== The plan ==
In June 1943, at Mayor Rodgers's prompting, the city council hired Bartholomew's firm. That September the firm published Your Dallas of Tomorrow: A Master Plan for a Greater Dallas, containing the first two reports; thirteen further, unpublished reports followed through May 1945. Together they addressed zoning, land use, streets, airports, parks, sanitation, public buildings, and housing, for downtown, outlying neighborhoods, and unincorporated county land alike.

Beyond quality-of-life matters, the plan aimed to streamline city government and strengthen Dallas's capacity for economic development, treating municipal government as a "system of systems" in need of structure and coordination.

The planners were chiefly worried that suburban growth was hollowing out the urban core. They proposed street extensions and widenings to improve access to downtown. The housing report documented substandard conditions near the central business district, criticized discriminatory practices confining Black residents to poor housing, and called for redevelopment of blighted areas, expanded public housing, and cooperation between city government and private enterprise. It marked the first time the city had set out to improve Black neighborhoods and housing comprehensively.

== Implementation ==
Citing the plan's call for regional political unity, city leaders sought in 1945 to annex University Park, Highland Park, and Preston Hollow. In the April vote Preston Hollow joined Dallas and the Park Cities declined; the city also took in about 40 square miles (100 km^{2}) of unincorporated land. In December 1945 voters approved a $40 million bond program, then the largest in city history, funding projects including expansions of Love Field and the Garza–Little Elm Reservoir (renamed Lake Dallas and later Lewisville Lake), Central Expressway (U.S. Highway 75), the Dallas Memorial Auditorium (now the Kay Bailey Hutchison Convention Center), and a new central library completed in 1955. The Greater Dallas Planning Council was created in November 1946 to advise on implementation, and in 1950 the firm's chief planner, Marvin Springer, became the city's planning director.

== Shortcomings and legacy ==
The plan underestimated postwar growth: population and traffic levels projected for 1970 were surpassed by 1951, leaving the street plan obsolete before completion. Developers defeated its zoning reforms, the state legislature withheld support for other elements, and the city struggled to fund infrastructure in newly annexed areas. Its housing recommendations nonetheless informed later public housing and urban renewal work, including Mayor R. L. Thornton's 1954 Citizens Housing Rehabilitation Committee. In 1955 Thornton appointed a Dallas Master Plan Committee, chaired by Dallas Chamber of Commerce president D. A. Hulcy, to produce a successor plan.
