= John Ware (city manager) =

John Lee Ware (March 16, 1948 – May 2, 2010) was an American public administrator and businessman who was city manager of Dallas from December 1993 to August 1998. He was the second Black city manager of Dallas, after Richard Knight Jr.

== Early life and education ==
Ware grew up in the housing projects of Arkadelphia, Arkansas. He served on active duty in the United States Army from 1968 to 1970, including in the Vietnam War, earning the Bronze Star and the Purple Heart. He graduated from Ouachita Baptist University with a degree in political science in 1973 and received a master's degree in public administration from the Maxwell School of Syracuse University in 1974.

== Career ==
Ware was an assistant city manager in New Rochelle, New York, from 1974 to 1978, in Newport News, Virginia, from 1978 to 1985, and in Austin, Texas, from 1985 to 1989. He became an assistant city manager of Dallas in 1989 and city manager in December 1993.

Ware took office during an economic slump, at the end of a turbulent and racially tense period at City Hall; he and Ron Kirk, who became mayor in 1995, were seen as symbols of a new era, as Black leaders who had the support of the city's business establishment. As the economy recovered, Ware cut the property tax rate while keeping the city's AAA bond rating. He helped bring the Nasher Sculpture Center to Dallas, proposed the first successful bond issue for the Trinity River Project, and started initiatives to bring housing downtown and business to the city's southern sector. He also promoted Mary Suhm to assistant city manager; she later became city manager herself. Profiles described his management style as brash, blunt and demanding, and on his retirement a representative of a city employee association called him a "control freak".

As city manager, Ware negotiated for the city with a group of investors led by Tom Hicks over the development that became the American Airlines Center, which kept the Dallas Mavericks downtown. A few months after the deal, he resigned to go into business with Hicks. The city attorney's office said he had broken no rules, but the episode helped prompt a push for a stricter city ethics code.

After leaving City Hall in 1998, Ware co-founded the private equity firm 21st Century Group with partners of Hicks, Muse, Tate & Furst (later HM Capital), which invested in minority-owned and minority-operated businesses; he was its president and chief executive until his death. He remained active in civic affairs, serving on the executive committee of the Greater Dallas Chamber, co-chairing its bond program task force in 2006, and chairing a fund supporting North Texas military families in 2007. At the time of his death he was chairman of the Dallas Citizens Council.

== Death ==
Ware was diagnosed with multiple myeloma in 1994 and died of the disease at his home in Dallas on May 2, 2010, at the age of 62. He was survived by his wife, Shirley, two sons and a grandson.
