= Dreyer's =

American ice cream manufacturer

Dreyer's Grand Ice Cream, Inc.
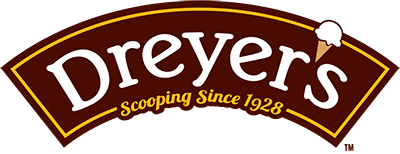

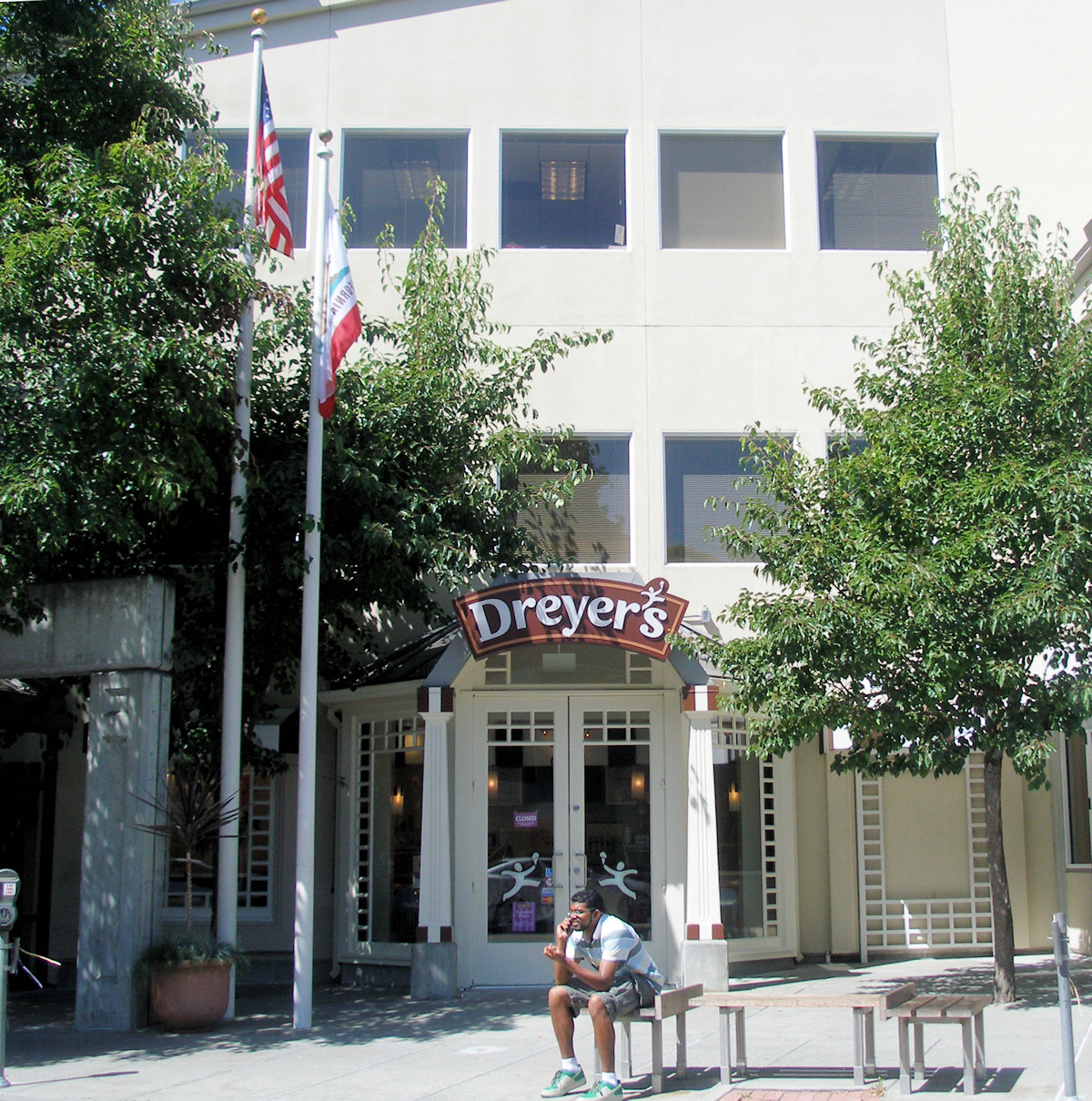
- Dreyer's headquarters in Oakland
- Type: Subsidiary
- Industry: Dairy
- Founded: 1928; 98 years ago
- Founder: William Dreyer; Joseph Edy
- Headquarters: Walnut Creek, California, California, United States
- Key people: Kim Peddle-Rguem, CEO
- Products: Ice cream
- Brands: Dreyer's; Edy's
- Number of employees: 2,400+ (2020)
- Parent: Froneri
- Website: Edy's and Dreyer's

Dreyer's Grand Ice Cream, Inc. (or simply Dreyer's) is an American ice cream and frozen dairy dessert company, founded in 1928 in Oakland, California. The company's two signature brands, Dreyer's Grand Ice Cream (/ˈdraɪ.ərz/) and Edy's Grand Ice Cream (/ˈiːdiz/), are named after its founders, William Dreyer and Joseph Edy. The Dreyer's brand is sold in the Western United States and Texas, while the Edy's brand is sold in the Eastern and Midwestern United States.

In 2002, Dreyer's was acquired by Nestlé. In 2020, Froneri, the joint venture between Nestlé and PAI Partners, agreed to take over all of Nestlé's U.S. ice cream businesses, including Dreyer's, Häagen-Dazs, and Drumstick.

== History ==
The company's two signature brand names, Edy's and Dreyer's, honor the company's founders: Joseph Edy, a candy maker, and William Dreyer, an ice cream maker. Joseph Oliver Edy was born in Missouri and raised in Montana. Edy operated a homemade candy and ice cream parlor at 122 North Broadway in Billings, Montana during the 1910s. In the 1920s, he and his wife Grace decided to join his brother John North Edy in California. In 1925, Joseph Edy opened the doors to Edy's Character Candies Shop in Oakland. Edy's high-quality candy quickly became recognized as among the best in the East Bay Area, and Edy was soon operating six shops. William Dreyer also ran a business in the 1920s, an ice cream manufacturing venture in the California dairy country community of Visalia. In 1926, he was recruited to run a large new plant in Oakland for National Ice Cream. While in Oakland, he met Joe Edy.

In 1928, Edy and Dreyer decided to join forces to manufacture ice cream. They secured a small factory and launched Edy's Grand Ice Cream (the "Grand" reflected their street address on Grand Avenue in Oakland). They focused on creative innovations to fuel their small venture. For example, the two men used Joseph Edy's knowledge and expertise in candy-making to create the original Rocky Road ice cream, from a combination of flavors which Edy had previously invented. The chocolate, marshmallow, and nut flavor was named Rocky Road as a means of describing the ice cream's texture as well as the troubled economic times of the Great Depression.

Edy and Dreyer are also credited with originating the Toasted Almond and Candy Mint flavors. At the time ice cream had limited flavors such as vanilla, chocolate, and strawberry, but Rocky Road, introduced in 1929, was one of the first combination of flavors. Because only large marshmallows were manufactured at the time, he used his wife's sewing scissors to cut marshmallows into bite-sized pieces to make the first batch of Rocky Road.

In 1947, the partnership was dissolved and in 1953, William Dreyer Jr. took over and changed the name to Dreyer's Grand Ice Cream. In 1963, Dreyer Jr. sold the company to his key officers—Al Wolff who ran the factory, Bob Boone who ran distribution, and Ken Cook, who managed sales and served as president from 1963 to 1977. Cook's vision was to provide American families with a truly premium ice cream they could enjoy at home. In 1977, with sales of $6 million and an employee base of 75 people, Cook sold the company to T. Gary Rogers and W. F. "Rick" Cronk for $1.1 million. In 1981, the company began public stock trading on the NASDAQ exchange, expanded and re-adopted the name Edy's Grand Ice Cream when marketing its product east of the Rocky Mountains, so as to not be confused with another company named Breyers (owned by Unilever since 1993). Hence they market under the Dreyer's name in the Western United States and Texas, and under the Edy's name in the Eastern and Midwestern United States.

Beginning in the late 1980s, Dreyer's formulated new products that contained less milk fat, fewer calories, smoother textures, and new flavors, creating the "Grand Light" brand, later labeled as frozen dairy desserts. Existing flavors were also reformulated. Such products cannot be labeled "ice cream" according to FDA regulations because they are manufactured to have less than the required 10% milk fat and 20% total milk solids to qualify as ice cream.

In 2002, Nestlé agreed to acquire 67% of Dreyer's for $3.2 billion. In December 2019, Nestlé announced that it would be selling all of its U.S. ice cream businesses (including Dreyer's, Häagen-Dazs, and Drumstick) to Froneri, the global ice cream manufacturer that Nestlé co-owns with PAI Partners.

=== Timeline ===
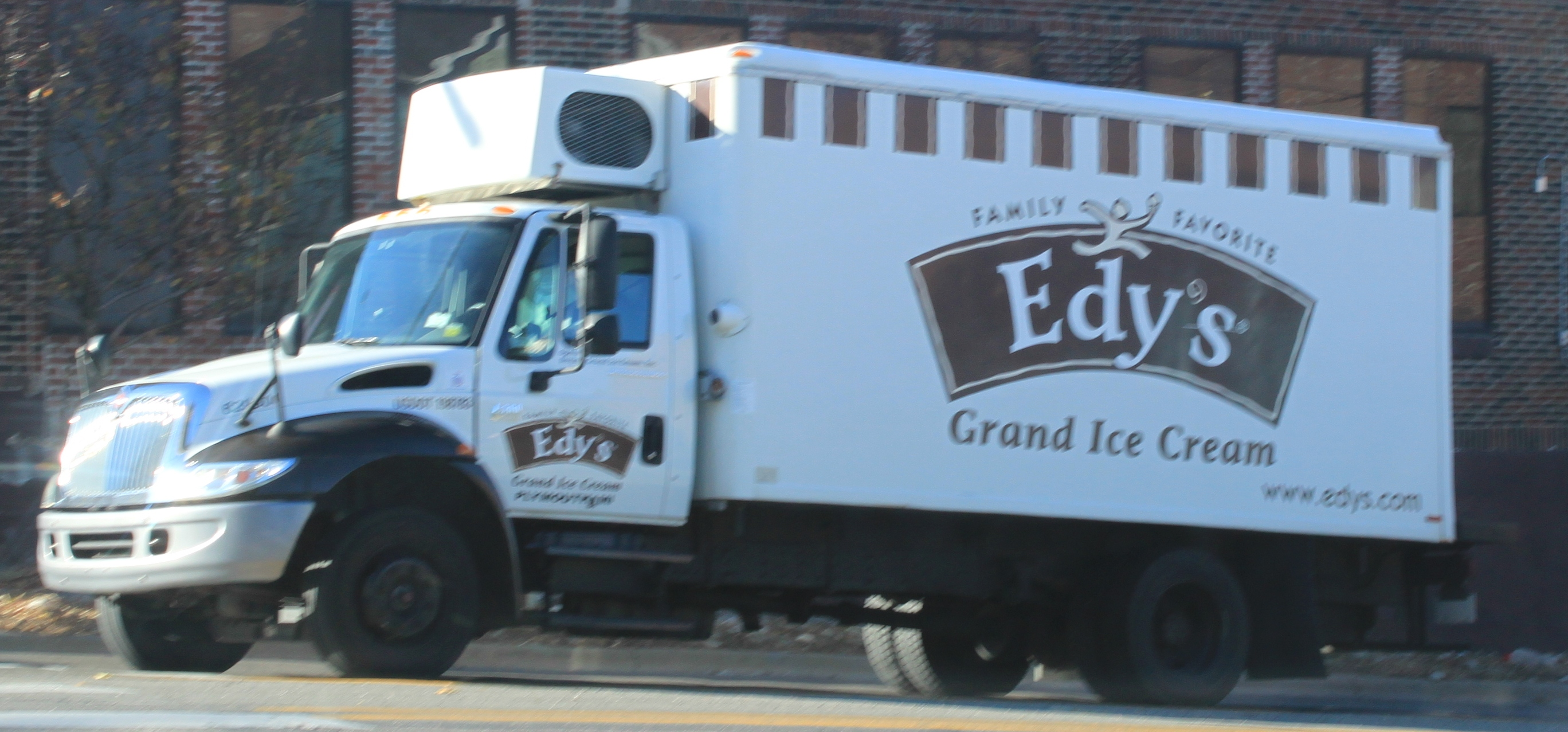
Edy's (brand from the Edy's Grand Ice Cream) delivery truck pictured in Ann Arbor, Michigan, 2010

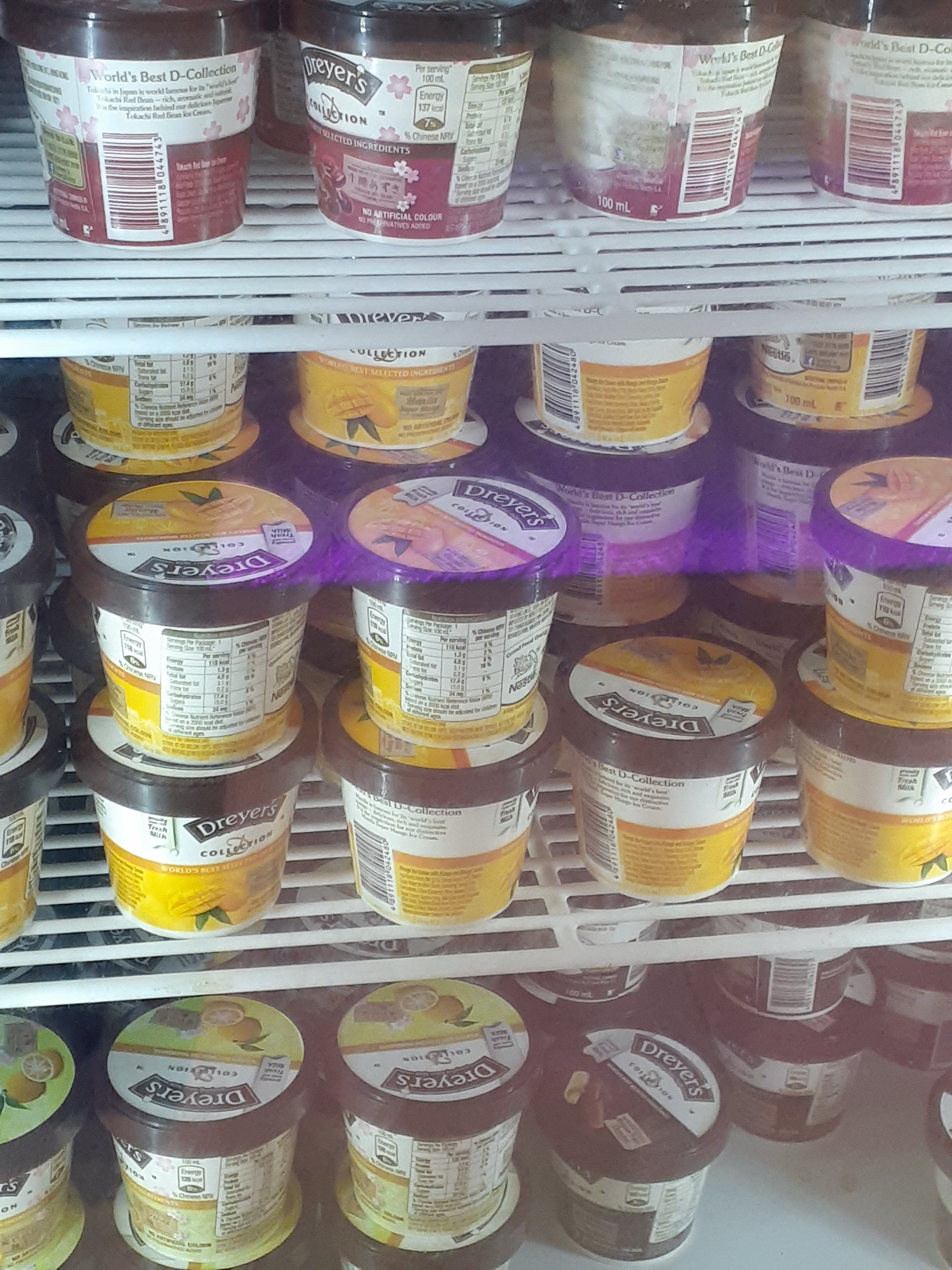
Pots of Dreyer's ice cream exhibited in Hong Kong

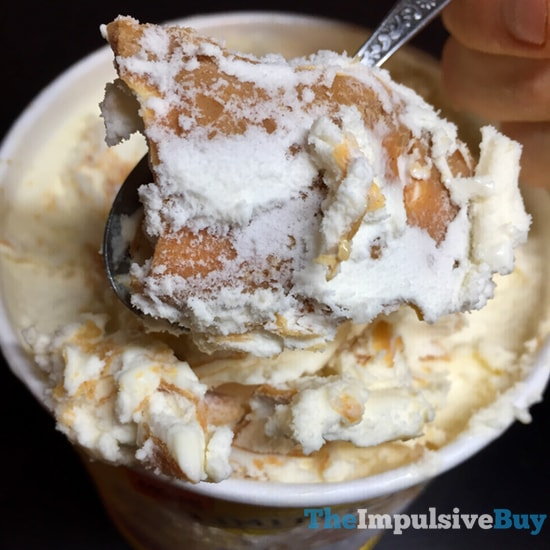
Dreyer's Limited Edition Toll House Peanut Butter Cookie Dough

- 1906: William Dreyer made his first frozen dessert to celebrate his ship's arrival in America from Germany.
- 1928: William Dreyer and Joseph Edy found Edy's Grand Ice Cream.
- 1929: In response to the Great Depression, Edy's invents Rocky Road ice cream.
- 1947: Dreyer and Edy dissolve their partnership, and Dreyer purchases and builds a new manufacturing plant at 5929 College Avenue in Oakland. After the dissolution of the partnership, Edy continued business under the Edy's name, selling candy and ice cream manufactured at the Edy's factory in Oakland. Edy's facilities were located in Palo Alto at the Town and Country Shopping Center, in San Francisco, Berkeley and several other Bay area cities. In 1961, an Edy's opened in Carmel-by-the-Sea under a franchise agreement.
- 1963: Reins to the business pass from the Dreyer family to Al Wolff, Bob Boone and Ken Cook.
- 1977: T. Gary Rogers and W.F. Cronk purchase Dreyer's Grand Ice Cream for $1 million.
- 1981: After private ownership, Dreyer's went public and its shares were traded on NASDAQ under the ticker symbol "DRYR". The company also re-adopted the Edy's Grand Ice Cream name when marketing its product east of the Rocky Mountains, so its not confused with Breyers. Since that time, Dreyer's ice cream has been made with Cook's Vanilla which is produced by Cook Flavoring Company.
- 1982: Dreyer's introduces a new flavor, Cookies N Cream.
- 1987: Dreyer's expanded their product offerings by creating Grand Light ice cream products (later described as frozen dairy desserts) having less dairy fat and fewer calories.
- 2004: Dreyer's began using a new churning processes called Slow Churned or low-temperature extrusion. Unlike traditional churning methods, the ice cream does not need to be frozen once it is done churning. Since this freezing stage produces large ice crystals, which gives the ice cream a grainy texture, manufacturers would add milk fat to counterbalance the grainy texture. As this extra freezing process isn't necessary with low-temperature extrusion, the "slow churned" line of ice cream is labeled as containing two-thirds the calories and half the fat of "regular" ice cream. Dreyer's has also extended this process to other brands besides its two flagship brands, such as Häagen-Dazs, which it produces under a license from General Mills.
- 2006: Dreyer's Whiskey Bottom Ice Cream plant in Laurel, Maryland, is expanded to give Dreyer's the two largest ice cream plants in the United States.
- 2006: Nestlé completed the acquisition of Dreyer's for $3.2 billion, thus becoming the biggest ice cream maker, with a 17.5% market share. Dreyer's has also acquired its own ice cream brands, including the Snelgrove's Ice Cream brand in Utah.
- 2016: Nestlé and PAI Partners agree to set up a joint venture, Froneri, to combine their ice cream and frozen food activities. Froneri initially is only set up for those businesses in Europe and other international countries.
- 2020: Nestle sells all of its US ice cream businesses, including Dreyer's, Häagen-Dazs, and Drumstick to Froneri for $4 billion.
