= Snelgrove's Ice Cream =

Former Utah-based ice cream brand

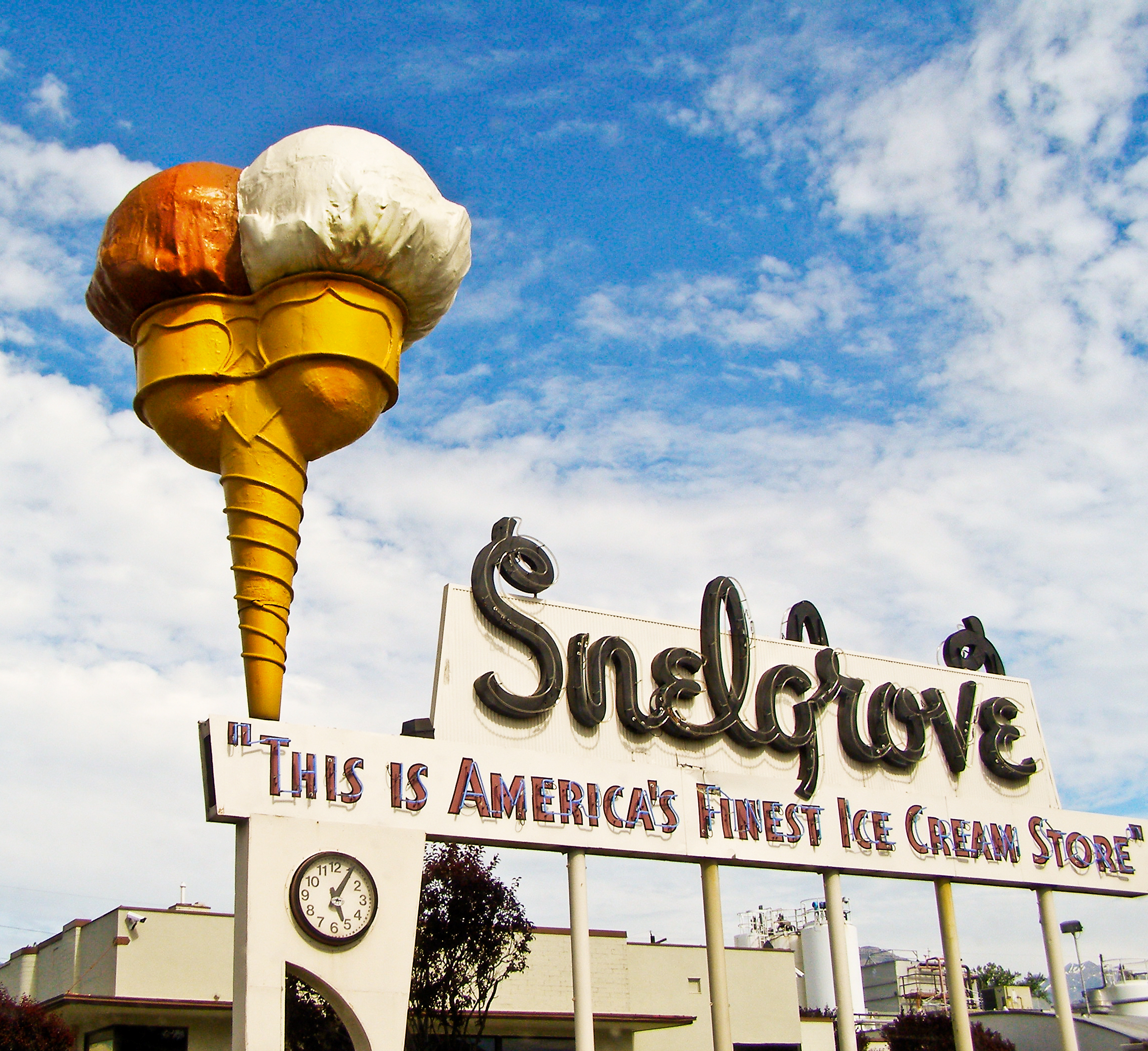
Snelgrove Ice Cream Parlor in Salt Lake City, Utah

Snelgrove Ice Cream was a family-owned company in Salt Lake City founded in 1929 by Charles Rich Snelgrove (1887-1976), and later managed by his eldest son C. Laird Snelgrove. The operation remained family-owned until about 1990. The name brand was owned by the Dreyer's company, which purchased the former Snelgrove ice cream factory.

Snelgrove ice cream parlors were located in various locations in the Salt Lake area and in other Utah communities. The largest of these was the flagship store located at 850 East 2100 South, in the Sugar House neighborhood of Salt Lake City, but it was torn down to make way for other developments in March 2021. The decor and architecture of the store was art deco. The store's look was enhanced with a 40-foot-wide sign (12 m) from the early 1960s, with the name Snelgrove in large looping cursive neon letters, and a spinning giant double cone. The factory producing Snelgrove Ice Cream was located directly behind this store. The next oldest location was the Snelgrove store on East South Temple in downtown Salt Lake City.

Because Snelgrove ice cream was a sentimental favorite in Utah, Dreyer's continued to make and distribute Snelgrove brand ice cream, using some of the original Snelgrove flavors like Canadian Vanilla and Burnt Almond Fudge. Snelgrove Ice Cream was sold in Utah, New Mexico, Idaho, Montana, and Colorado. On February 19, 2008, Dreyer's Ice Cream announced it would no longer make the Snelgrove brand.

Recently the store was reopened under the Snelgrove name using many of the original recipes. The store was opened under a new owner, Lyndsey Cotter, who is a descendant of the original owners of Snelgrove Ice Cream.
