= Choc-top =

Chocolate-dipped ice-creams popular in Australia and New Zealand

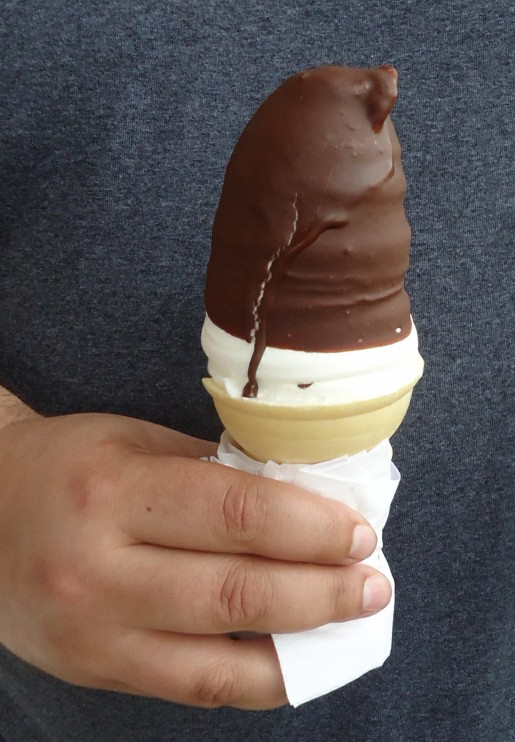
- Chocolate dipped cream cone
- Alternative names: Choc bombs
- Type: Ice cream
- Place of origin: Australia, New Zealand
- Main ingredients: Vanilla ice cream, milk chocolate

Choc-tops (also known as choc bombs in Western Australia) are chocolate-dipped ice-cream popular in both Australia and New Zealand and traditionally eaten at the cinema. In some dialects choc bombs refers to the hard chocolate covered ice cream at the cinema whereas choc tops are the soft serve version thereof and dispensed from ice cream vans such as Mr Whippy.

The traditional choc-top is one scoop of vanilla ice-cream covered in a hard milk chocolate shell, sitting atop an ice-cream cone. Variations include different ice-cream flavours, such as chocolate, choc-mint, boysenberry, strawberry, caramel, banana, rum and raisin, chocolate chili, and cookies and cream. The chocolate shell may be studded with confectionery, nuts or sprinkles, and mixed with flavourings. Examples include covered with chopped peanuts called a 'hedgehog' or with a half 'Flake' chocolate bar placed in the top of the ice cream before dipping in chocolate called a 'rocket'. Some examples of branded choc-tops include Connoisseur, Bulla, Valhalla and Golden North.

Though today choc-tops are often mass-produced, many cinemas - including large chains - still make them by hand, and the quality or novelty of a cinema's choc-tops can be a draw for movie-goers.

Rowena Foods, established in 1990, was one of the largest distributors of choc tops to cinema chains in Australia, until Bulla Dairy Foods bought them in 2013.
