= Citizens Charter Association =

Political organization in Dallas, Texas (1930–1977)

- Abbreviation: CCA
- Formation: 1930
- Dissolved: 1977
- Type: Municipal political organization
- Headquarters: Dallas, Texas, U.S.
- First president: Hugh Grady

The Citizens Charter Association (CCA) was a political organization that nominated and campaigned for candidates for the Dallas City Council in Dallas, Texas. Formed in 1930 to win adoption of the council–manager form of city government, it controlled a majority of the city council for most of the period from 1931 to 1975, and came to be regarded as the political arm of the Dallas Citizens Council. Weakened by criticism of its undemocratic character and by the rise of rival political groups, it lost its majority after a 1975 court ruling replaced most at-large council seats with single-member districts, and it dissolved in 1977.

== History ==
=== Charter reform ===
In the late 1920s, reformers in Dallas sought to replace the city's commission form of government with a council–manager system. When Mayor J. Waddy Tate twice vetoed putting a new charter before the voters, its supporters organized the Citizens Charter Association, with charter drafters Hugh Grady and Louis Head as its first president and vice president. The CCA instead wrote thirty-nine amendments to the city's 1907 charter that accomplished the same changes, gathered petition signatures from 10 percent of eligible voters to force a referendum, and campaigned for them. Voters adopted the amendments on October 10, 1930.

The founders then made the CCA a permanent organization that met before each municipal election to select, endorse, and campaign for a slate of council candidates, much as the earlier Citizens Association of Dallas had done. The CCA presented itself as a safeguard against self-interested politicians, backing only candidates of good character, but its nominations were controlled by a leadership drawn mainly from business and the professions, and its candidates generally favored business interests.

=== Early elections ===
The CCA's first slate, nine conservative businessmen, won every seat in 1931, either unopposed or by wide margins; challenging such well-funded candidates in citywide races was prohibitively expensive. The full slate won again in 1933. The council's choice of city manager, John North Edy, proved controversial for his strict budgeting, especially his efforts to raise revenue quickly to cover the city's costs for the 1936 Texas Centennial Exposition, and a rival slate swept the CCA from office in 1935.

Before the 1937 election, the Progressive Voters League and the Negro Chamber of Commerce quadrupled the number of registered Black voters compared with three years earlier, making Black voters a significant force in a Dallas election for the first time. The league endorsed the slate of the Forward Dallas Association, which also drew support from white working-class voters and won five seats to the CCA's four. In later elections the CCA courted Black and labor voters successfully.

=== Dominance ===
The founding of the Dallas Citizens Council in 1937 was central to the CCA's subsequent dominance. Although the two groups never had a formal relationship, Citizens Council members shaped the CCA's choice of candidates, either as CCA members themselves or through ties to its members. Roscoe L. Thomas, who became CCA president in 1938, cemented the arrangement by giving Citizens Council founder Robert L. Thornton a seat on the nominating committee in return for financial support. The nine candidates chosen with Thornton's input swept the 1939 election, and over the next two decades the CCA lost only two races, in 1947 and 1959. J. Woodall Rodgers became the first mayor of this period. After a clean sweep in 1941, the CCA slate ran unopposed in 1943, the first uncontested election in the city's history, and again in 1945 and 1955.

=== Decline ===
The CCA argued that its candidates were citizens rather than career politicians, representing the city as a whole rather than particular interests. By the late 1950s, however, it faced growing criticism as undemocratic and as favoring downtown business, while neighborhood political groups and the Republican Party gained strength in local politics. Accusations that the CCA was a political machine run by its longtime president, Laurence Melton, led to his resignation before the 1961 election, and the nominating process was opened to wider public participation. The CCA nonetheless lost the mayor's office to Earle Cabell in 1961 and 1963.

Seeking a broader base, the CCA began nominating more women and minority candidates. In 1969 it endorsed civil rights activist George L. Allen and Anita Martinez, who became, respectively, the first Black person elected to the city council and the first Hispanic council member. The CCA kept its council majority, but the independent Wes Wise won the mayoralty in 1971, 1973, and 1975.

The 1971 race exposed divisions within the business establishment: Robert Stewart, head of First International Bank, blocked the CCA's preferred mayoral candidate, Charles Cullum, and the substitute nominee, Avery Mays, was decisively beaten by Wise. In 1973 John Schoellkopf reorganized the association as a "new CCA" that brought new faces into city politics, though the change drew opposition from older leaders such as John Stemmons.

In January 1975, in a suit brought in 1971 by Black and Mexican American residents led by civil rights leader Al Lipscomb, a federal district court held that Dallas's at-large election system was unconstitutional because it diluted minority voting strength and made campaigns too costly. The court gave the city the opportunity to devise a remedy, and the city council adopted a plan under which eight members would be elected from single-member districts and three, including the mayor, citywide; the court approved it, and the April 1975 election was held under it. Voters made the plan part of the city charter in 1976, and in Wise v. Lipscomb (1978) the U.S. Supreme Court upheld it as a legislative plan, reversing an appeals court that had required single-member districts only. The change was a decisive blow to the CCA. Its president, John Schoellkopf, who had led efforts to modernize the organization, resigned to challenge Wise for mayor and was badly defeated, and the CCA's more diverse, less business-oriented slate won only six of eleven seats. When Allen resigned later in 1975, the CCA became a council minority for the first time since the 1930s. In the 1976 special election to succeed Wise, Robert Folsom, though sympathetic to the CCA's pro-business outlook, declined its endorsement, which had come to be seen as a liability. The CCA disbanded in 1977.

== See also ==
- Dallas Citizens Council
- History of Dallas
