= Kelly's of Cornwall =

English ice cream manufacturer

- Company type: Private limited company
- Industry: Ice cream
- Founded: c. 1890
- Headquarters: Bodmin, Cornwall, United Kingdom
- Parent: Froneri
- Website: www.kellysofcornwall.co.uk

Kelly's of Cornwall is a manufacturer of ice cream based in Bodmin, Cornwall. It was founded in the 19th century in St Austell and ran as a family business for over 100 years. It is now owned by the conglomerate Froneri based in Yorkshire. The company has achieved national prominence in the UK with its television advertising that promotes the Cornish language.

From June 2013 to June 2014, Kelly's produced around 14 1/2 million litres of clotted ice cream. During the same period, the company announced that it was the sixth largest ice cream manufacturer in Britain and forecast projected sales at £23 million for 2016.

== History ==
=== Local history ===
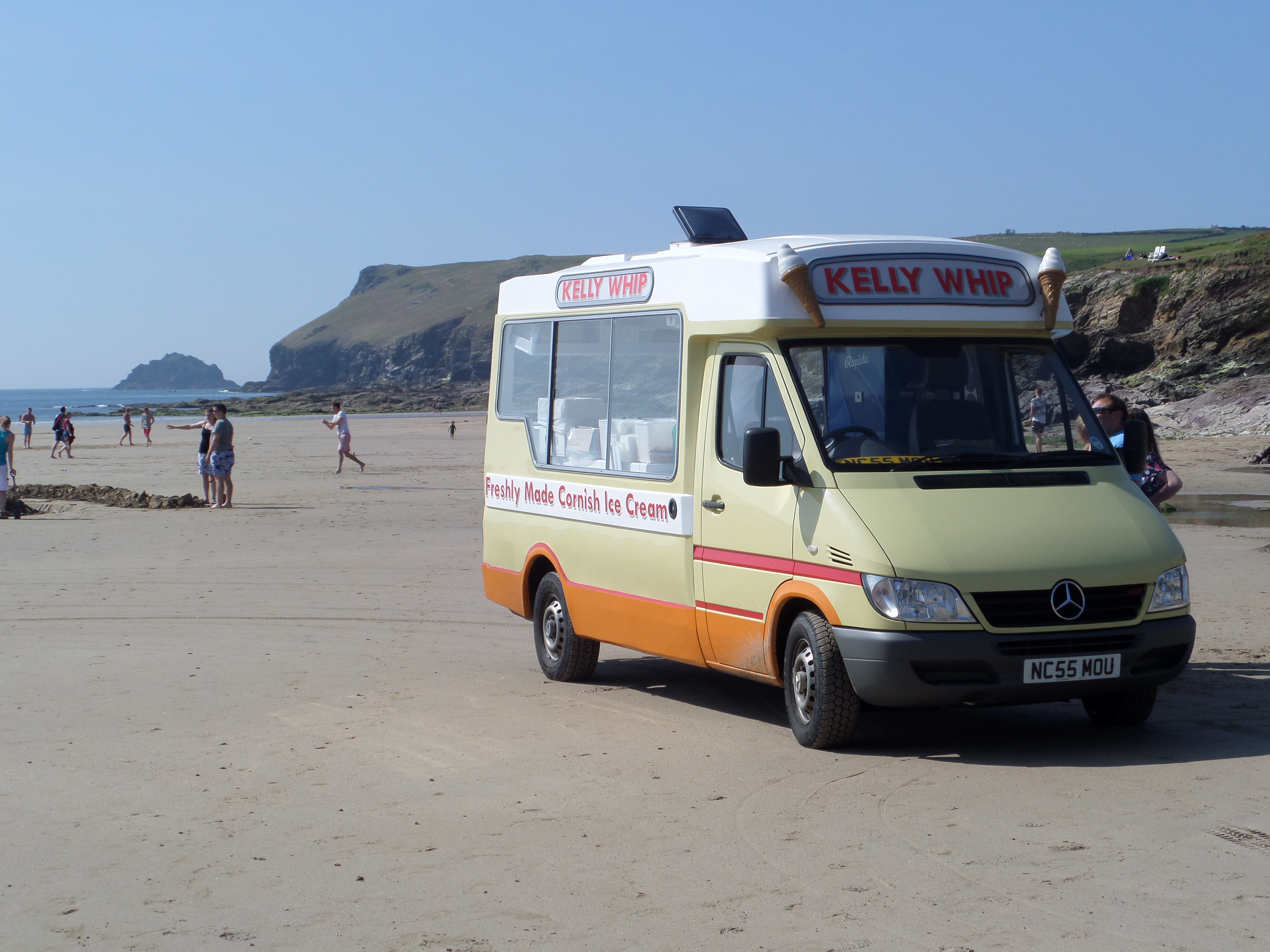
A Kelly's ice cream van parked at Polzeath in 2012

The company was established as an ice cream and fish and chips business by Joseph Staffieri in the late 19th century after he migrated from Italy to St Austell. His son-in-law, Lazero Calicchia took over the business in 1918, using a horse and cart to distribute ice cream around Cornwall. The mobile business operated with vans regularly travelling to beaches and landmarks around the county. The family name was changed to Kelly (with the company name following suit) in the 1930s, moving to Bodmin in the 1970s. The ice cream became popular at agricultural shows and has been a fixture at the Royal Cornwall Show since 1947.

The ice cream has been produced from milk and clotted cream farmed and pasteurised from a nearby dairy farm at Trewithen.

=== National success ===
Having become a popular ice cream in Cornwall, R&R Ice Cream (now Froneri) announced a buyout of the company in 2008 to enable the product to be distributed nationally. The merger was completed in 2010 and allowed the product to be stocked in national supermarkets such as Tesco, though the company still tightly controls who is allowed to sell the ice cream. Kelly's continue to run the ice cream van fleet independently of R&R. As part of the takeover, they have invested more in various "scooping parlours" that sell ice cream over the counter around Cornwall, including refurbishment of the buildings. As of 2016 Kelly's had at least 49 parlours spread across the county.

From June 2013 to June 2014, Kelly's produced around 14.5 million litres (3.2m imp gal; 3.8m US gal) of their clotted ice cream. The same year, the company announced it was the sixth largest ice cream manufacturer in Britain. After a projected record sales of £23 million forecast for 2016, the company announced it would invest £2 million at its Bodmin factory, on the Walker Lines Industrial Estate, in order to increase output.

In 2021, the packaging was rebranded and the range of ice cream expanded to include new chocolate and raspberry ripple flavours. Kelly's also announced they would sponsor the Bumblebee Conservation Trust.

== Promotion of Cornish ==
"Yma res nowydh kavadow a Kelly's Cornish ice cream hag yw as tasty as."
("There's a new range of Kelly's Cornish ice cream available that is as tasty as.")

— Opening line of the Cornish speaker in the 2016 TV advert

The company is a strong supporter of the Cornish language. In May 2016 it invested £2 million with the advertising agency Isobel for a prominent television and online advertising campaign. The advert was the first shown on national British television to make use of Cornish, featuring a man attempting to sell ice cream in a field of cows at Millbrook. It was shown on prime time television, including breaks in Britain's Got Talent.

After central Government funding for the Cornish language ceased in 2016, company representatives protested outside the Houses of Parliament. Following the advert's success, councillors in Cornwall hoped that the company's profits could be re-invested into local schemes helping to revive the language. The Cornish Language Partnership's Mark Trevethan said that while the adverts were entertaining, they made a serious point about the importance of language and the celebration of local culture.

== See also ==
- List of ice cream brands
