= Drumstick (frozen dairy dessert) =

Type of ice cream cone dessert

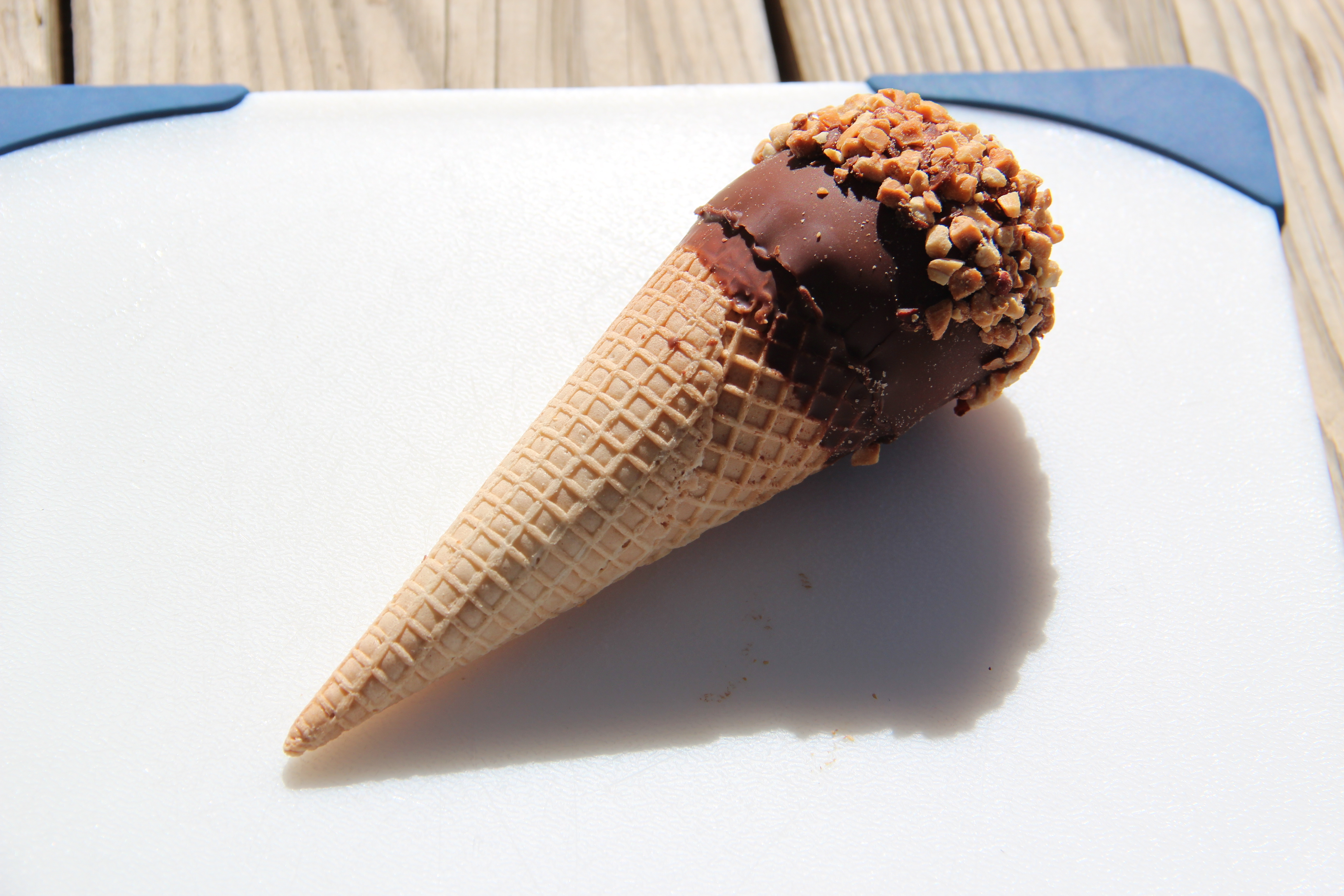
- Product type: Ice cream
- Current owner: Froneri
- Country: United States
- Introduced: 1928; 98 years ago
- Markets: Worldwide
- Website: www.drumstick.com

Drumstick is the brand name, owned by Froneri, a joint venture between Nestlé and PAI Partners, for a variety of frozen dessert-filled ice cream cones sold in the United States, Australia, Canada, Malaysia, Hong Kong, and other countries. The original product was invented by I.C. Parker of the Drumstick Company of Fort Worth, Texas, in 1928.

== Overview ==
A typical drumstick consists of a sugar cone filled with vanilla frozen dairy dessert topped with a hardened chocolate shell and nuts, and much later, with a chocolate-lined cone and a chunk of chocolate at the bottom invented at the West End factory in Brisbane. Normally the ice cream would soak into the moist cone during the manufacturing process which would have made it soggy and unpalatable when served, however this problem is overcome by insulating the inside of the waffle cone from the ice cream with a coating of oil, sugar, and chocolate. A hard chocolate shell at the top of the sugar cone holds its shape in case the ice cream starts to melt.

Drumsticks are available from a variety of supermarkets, ice cream trucks, and convenience stores. In the case of drumsticks labelled for individual sale, they are packaged in a rigid plastic wrapper.

Due to the historic popularity of this dessert, it is commonly called a "drumstick" even if it is manufactured by some other company and branded otherwise. "Forever Summer" has been a tagline for this brand.

== History ==
In 1928, the Parker Brothers – Bruce, I.C., and J.T. – added to the invention of the waffle cone by adding a chocolate coating with nuts to it. One of the brothers' wives said that this invention looked like a chicken leg, commonly nicknamed a drumstick in the US.

Nestlé purchased the Drumstick Company in 1991. In 2016, Nestlé and PAI Partners established Froneri, a joint venture to combine the two companies' ice cream activities.

In 2019, a cereal from General Mills based on Drumsticks was released with two flavors, vanilla and mint chocolate.

== Flavors ==
Additional varieties of Drumstick include caramel and fudge-filled cones, Mint Chocolate Crunch, Cookies and Cream Crunch, and simply dipped, cones filled with caramel, chocolate, and plain vanilla are also found. In Canada, Nestlé offers a chocolate dipped Oreo Drumstick as well as Strawberry Cheesecake Drumstick.

According to the official website, the following Drumstick flavors are produced:

- Classic
- Simply Dipped
- Pretzel Dipped
- Crunch Dipped
- Cookie Dipped
- Mini Drums
- Lil’ Drums
- Sprinkled!
- Super Nugget
- King Size

== Non-dairy additions ==
In early 2020, Nestlé released two vegan varieties of the dessert in Canada.

- Caramel
- Vanilla Chocolate Swirl

On April 16, 2021, Nestlé Canada recalled both flavors over concerns that the products may contain dairy not included on the ingredients label.

== See also ==
- Cornetto (ice cream), competitor from Unilever
- Choc-top, ice cream cone dipped in chocolate coating
