= Frederick's Dairies =

British ice cream manufacturer

Frederick's Dairies was an ice cream manufacturer that held the licence to make a number of branded ice cream products and variations. The company currently owns the licence to make a range of Del Monte and Cadbury's ices, including a number of Flake branded cones to compete with Wall's Cornetto, and a range of hand-held ice creams based on Cadbury's Dairy Milk range.

Fredericks Dairies was acquired by R&R Ice Cream for £49 million in April 2013. It thus acquired control of Cadbury, Del Monte and Britvic ice cream brands.

== History ==
The family first developed commercially near to the Italian Riviera in 1896. They then moved to the North West of England and started working on the Mars bar ice cream. The company is based in Skelmersdale, Lancashire.

It is based in Chorley, Lancashire. Along Bolton Road Fredericks was once the UK's number one independently owned ice cream company which manufactures and sells ice cream for brands such as Kraft foods, Del Monte, Tangerine confectionery, Antonio Federici, Lyle's and Britvic soft drinks.
