= Froneri =

British ice cream manufacturer

Froneri International Limited
- Type: Joint venture
- Industry: Food processing
- Predecessor: R&R Ice Cream
- Founded: 1985 (as Richmond Ice Cream); 2016 (as Froneri)
- Founder: James Lambert
- Headquarters: North Yorkshire, United Kingdom
- Area served: Worldwide
- Key people: Luis Cantarell (Chairman); Phil Griffin (CEO)
- Products: Ice cream
- Owners: Nestlé (50%); PAI Partners (50%)
- Subsidiaries: Peters Ice Cream; Tip Top; Kelly's of Cornwall; Dreyer's
- Website: www.froneri.com

Froneri International Limited is a British ice cream manufacturer with its headquarters in Leeming Bar, North Yorkshire, England. It is the second-largest producer of ice cream in the world by retail sales, after The Magnum Ice Cream Company, with the two companies together accounting for approximately 32% of total global retail sales.

Froneri was established in 2016 as a joint venture between Nestlé and PAI Partners to combine the two companies' ice cream activities. PAI Partners had previously acquired R&R Ice Cream in 2013. R&R was originally founded as Richmond Ice Cream in 1985. Froneri expanded by initiating consolidation in the European ice cream market. It then took control over Nestlé's USA's ice cream division in 2020.

The company has a turnover of £750 million, and employs 15,000 people. The main production site is located at Leeming Bar, and employs 665 people in the largest ice cream factory in Europe. Smaller production sites are located in Skelmersdale and Bodmin, Cornwall.

== History ==
The company was founded as Richmond Ice Cream in 1985, when Bedale farmer Jonathan Ropner acquired Cardosi, a Thornaby ice cream manufacturer. Cardosi had £40,000 of ice cream manufacturing equipment, and had offered itself up for sale. Ropner asked his friend, James Lambert to run the company. Lambert claimed that the pair knew "nothing" about ice cream manufacturing. The company initially had just five employees. In 1987, the company's first major success occurred when it won a contract to manufacture own-label ice cream for supermarket chain Morrisons, which had 44 stores at the time. The company acquired Windsor Creameries from Trevor Hemmings in 1994. In return, Hemmings gained a 40% stake in Richmond.

In 1997, Richmond completed a reverse takeover of the publicly listed ice lolly manufacturer Treats Group, based in Leeds, which gave them the Crossgates site and far greater leverage in negotiations with supermarkets. The deal meant that the newly formed entity was publicly listed. Allied Frozen Foods was acquired from Associated British Foods in 2000. It acquired Nestle's loss-making UK ice cream business, Lyons Maid, including FAB, in 2001.

On 5 May 2006, Richmond Foods announced that it was to be taken over by Oaktree Capital Management, which merged the company with Roncadin, founded by Regina Roncadin, the largest German own-brand label ice cream manufacturer, to make the largest ice cream manufacturer in Europe. The company was then known as R&R Ice Cream. In 2008, it acquired Cornish ice cream producer Kelly's, followed by French business Rolland in 2010.

R&R acquired Frederick's Dairies for £49 million in April 2013. It thus acquired control of the licenses for producing Cadbury, Del Monte and Britvic branded ice cream.

In August 2012, the company acquired Eskigel (for £60.5 million), an Italian ice cream manufacturer whose factory is located in Terni (Umbria), about 65 miles north of Rome.

In April 2013, R&R was acquired by the French private equity firm PAI Partners for £715 million. As a result, James Lambert moved from the chief executive role to chairman.

In October 2013, R&R's founder was named entrepreneur of the year at EY's annual awards hosted by Jeremy Vine. Lambert will now go on to compete globally with more than 60 other country winners at the EY World Entrepreneur Of The Year awards in Monte Carlo next year.

In 2016, Nestlé and PAI Partners agreed to set up a joint venture known as Froneri which combined the two companies' ice cream activities throughout Europe and other international countries.

On 11 December 2019, Froneri announced that it will expand into the North American market with the acquisition of Nestle USA's Ice Cream division for $4 billion USD which includes brands such as Dreyer's, Häagen-Dazs and Drumstick. The acquisition completed in Q1 2020.

In October 2025, The Wall Street Journal reported Froneri secured a €1.4 billion investment from private-equity firm PAI Partners and the Abu Dhabi Investment Authority. The investment valued the firm at €15 billion.

== UK operations ==
The company manufactures over 600 million ice lollies every year, produces and packages over 70% of 2-litre supermarket own-brand ice cream, including for major UK supermarkets such as Tesco and Asda, and employs around 665 people at its Leeming Bar plant.

The Bodmin site employs 30 people.
