= Dick Knight =

Dick Knight may refer to:

- Dick Knight (businessman), English businessman and former chairman of Brighton & Hove Albion F.C.
- Dick Knight (tennis) (born 1948), American tennis player
- Dick Knight (golfer) (1929–1991), American professional golfer

== See also ==
- Richard Knight (disambiguation)
