= Elgin English Crull =

Dallas city manager

Elgin English Crull (July 17, 1908–1976) was the city manager of Dallas, Texas from 1952 to 1966. (Note: In his Warren Commission testimony, Crull described his duties and responsibilities as city manager: "The city manager, under the Dallas Charter, is the chief administrator of the city government, being charged with the overall supervision of most of the departments of the government. There are a few exceptions. Being charged with the financial control and the operation of the budget, and the operation of the different departments. The city manager is charged with the responsibility of appointing and removing department heads, and assistant department heads, the balance of the organization being under civil service.") Crull was deposed by Warren Commission assistant counsel Leon D. Hubert, Jr. on July 14, 1964 in Dallas.

== Early life and education ==
Crull was a native of Louisville, Kentucky. He briefly attended Ohio's Western Reserve Academy and Indiana's Culver Military Academy. For higher education, Crull first matriculated at Purdue University in West Lafayette, Indiana for the 1926-27 academic year. Already before enrolling at Purdue, Crull had shown an interest in becoming a newspaper reporter and was familiar with the work that Walter Williams had done to promote journalism, including the founding of the Missouri School of Journalism. That interest prompted Crull to transfer to the University of Missouri in Columbia, Missouri in 1927 to enroll in the school that Williams had built. There he worked on the student newspaper and was an active member of Kappa Sigma fraternity.

== Career ==
After the University of Missouri, Crull came to Dallas, Texas in 1931 to become a reporter for the Dallas Journal. He quickly rose to become a senior reporter and was in that capacity when the Dallas Journal merged with the Dallas Dispatch in 1938. Because he covered the city beat, Crull came to the attention of James W. Aston, Dallas's city manager at the time who hired him to become his assistant. From 1942 to 1946, Crull served as a U.S. Air Force officer with the rank of major and spent more than half of his time in the service with the management control staff of the Pentagon. He returned to Dallas to assume his old job. This time serving under Roderic B. Thomas. When Charles C. Ford became the city manager in 1951, Crull became the assistant city manager and thereafter city manager when Ford resigned. In 1966, he resigned to become both a vice-president of the Howard Corporation and the Republic National Bank (First Republic Bank Corporation), retiring from both positions in late 1974. Crull died in Dallas's Parkland Hospital in 1976 after a long illness. He was survived by his wife, Katherine Virginia Galbraith.

== City manager ==
Curry was an assistant city manager or city manager in Dallas for over 25 years. For fourteen years (1952–1966), Crull was Dallas' city manager, holding the position during the administration of four mayors: J.B. Adoue, Jr., R.L. Thornton, Earle Cabell, and Erik Jonsson. "This was a time when Dallas experienced its greatest growth under Crull's tight efficient government. He is credited with creating a series of capital improvement programs which resulted in extensive public works projects: The present city hall, Dallas Memorial Auditorium, Love Field Terminal and much of the city's major thoroughfares were among the projects completed while he was in office".

Jesse Curry, who became Chief of the Dallas Police Department in January 1960, was appointed to the position by Crull.

== Professional associations ==
Crull was president of the Texas City Managers Association in 1957. He had been a member and past vice-president of the International City Managers Association, as well as a member of the Municipal Finance Officers Association and a Rotarian.
