= Woodall Rodgers =

American politician

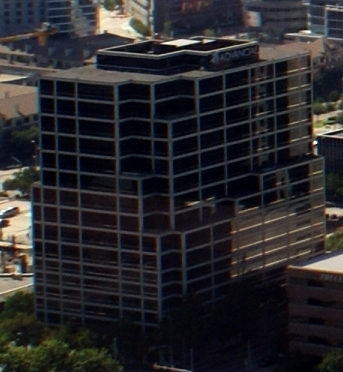
Woodall Rodgers Tower

James Woodall Rodgers (May 11, 1890 – July 6, 1961) was an American attorney, businessman, and civic leader who served as mayor of Dallas, Texas, from 1939 to 1947. As mayor he championed planned growth for the city, and at his urging the city council hired Harland Bartholomew to draft the Bartholomew Plan.

== Early life and education ==
Rodgers was born in New Market, Alabama. He earned a B.A. from Vanderbilt University in 1912 and an LL.B. from the University of Texas in 1915, and later did graduate work at Columbia University.

== Law and business career ==
Rodgers began practicing law in Dallas in 1916. After the United States entered World War I, he enlisted in the United States Army as a private on June 7, 1917; by his discharge on December 15, 1918, he had risen to major in the field artillery.

Back in Dallas, he joined the law firm of Saner and Saner. In 1925 he and Charles D. Turner founded their own firm, which concentrated on oil and gas law, and for many years Rodgers represented the Standard Oil Company of Indiana and its Texas subsidiaries. He was president of the Dallas Bar Association in 1938 and a director of Delta Air Lines.

== Mayor of Dallas ==
Rodgers was elected mayor of Dallas in 1939 and served until 1947. His administration put the city on a cash operating basis and pressed for growth. Directed by Rodgers, the city council hired planner Harland Bartholomew, and action on Bartholomew's master plan began after voters approved $40 million in bonds in December 1945. During Rodgers's tenure the city expanded Love Field, began work on the Garza–Little Elm Reservoir (later Lewisville Lake), and undertook Central Expressway (US 75), the Dallas Memorial Auditorium, and the Dallas Public Library.

He was elected president of the American Municipal Association (now the National League of Cities) in 1946.

== Civic activities and honors ==
Rodgers founded and served as president of the Greater Dallas Planning Council. He was a trustee of the Dallas Museum of Fine Arts (now the Dallas Museum of Art) and a director of the Dallas Symphony Orchestra, the State Fair of Texas, and the Dallas Public Library. In 1920 he helped organize the Dallas Salesmanship Club and became its first president. He was a member of the Law Institute of America and a trustee of the Southwestern Legal Foundation and of Vanderbilt University.

== Personal life and death ==
Rodgers married Edna P. Cristler on November 9, 1920. He was a Presbyterian, a Mason, and a Shriner. He died at his home in Dallas on July 6, 1961, after a long illness.

== Legacy ==
Woodall Rodgers Freeway, which runs north of downtown Dallas, between U.S. Highway 75 and Interstate 35E is named in his honor, as is Woodall Rodgers Plaza, which connects the West End with Victory and runs under the highway that also bears his name.

Political offices
Preceded by George Sprague	Mayors of Dallas; 1939–1947	Succeeded by J. R. Temple
