= T. C. Broadnax =

T. C. Broadnax is an American public administrator who has been the city manager of Austin, Texas, since May 6, 2024. He was previously city manager of Dallas from 2017 to 2024 and of Tacoma, Washington, from 2012 to 2017, and earlier served as an assistant city manager in San Antonio and Pompano Beach, Florida. He resigned from the Dallas post in 2024 after a majority of the city council, citing his strained relationship with Mayor Eric Johnson, asked him to step down.

== Early career ==
Broadnax grew up in a military family in Topeka, Kansas. He has said that seeing city promises of neighborhood redevelopment go unfulfilled as a child led him to a career in public administration. He earned bachelor's degrees in political science and organizational communication at Washburn University in Topeka, and a master's degree in public administration from the University of North Texas in 1993. He began his career as a budget analyst for Broward County, Florida, and in 1996 joined the city of Pompano Beach, where he held several positions including deputy city manager. He became an assistant city manager of San Antonio in 2006 and city manager of Tacoma in 2012.

== Career ==
=== Dallas ===
In December 2016 the Dallas City Council voted unanimously to hire Broadnax as city manager, choosing him from five finalists among more than 100 applicants to succeed the retiring A.C. Gonzalez; he was the city's first chief executive hired from outside City Hall in decades. He took office on February 1, 2017, pledging to put "service first" and to increase transparency and accountability. A month into the job the city faced a staffing crisis at its 911 call center. During his first year he created the city's Office of Homeless Solutions and pushed for a $1.05 billion bond package, which voters approved in November 2017. He later helped start a regional rehousing initiative that moved more than 2,700 homeless people into housing over two years. Amid protests against police violence in 2020, he oversaw a set of police reforms. His administration also created RIGHT Care, under which police officers answer mental-health 911 calls with fire department paramedics and social workers.

Early in the COVID-19 pandemic, Broadnax and Mayor Eric Johnson began to clash in public over the limits of each other's authority, including control of council meetings. The dispute came to a head at a council meeting in June 2020. In June 2022, five council members filed a memorandum calling for an expedited performance review of Broadnax, and he was privately offered the chance to resign. Johnson publicly called for "a change in city management", and the Dallas Builders Association and the city's firefighters' union called for his removal, citing a years-long backlog in the building permit office, staffing shortages at the 911 call center, and the city's accidental deletion of millions of police department files. Broadnax declined to resign, and after three of the memorandum's signatories withdrew their names, the special council meeting at which he could have been removed was cancelled.

On February 21, 2024, after a majority of council members suggested he step down, Broadnax announced his resignation effective June 3. Six council members said in a statement that the relationship between the mayor and the city manager had "not been conducive to effective governance"; Broadnax said he hoped his departure would let the council reset. At the time he was paid $423,246 a year and oversaw a $4.6 billion budget and more than 13,000 employees. His deputy, Kim Tolbert, was named interim city manager on his departure and was appointed to the post permanently in January 2025.

=== Austin ===
On April 4, 2024, the Austin City Council voted to appoint Broadnax as city manager, succeeding Spencer Cronk, whom the council had fired in February 2023. He was the sole finalist following a national search, with an initial base salary of $470,017, and took office on May 6, 2024.

In July 2025 Broadnax proposed a $6.3 billion budget for the 2026 fiscal year, the largest in the city's history, closing a projected $33 million general fund shortfall through departmental reductions and staffing changes.

Later that month, an Austin American-Statesman investigation of discretionary spending by city officials reported that Broadnax had charged roughly 150 lunches, totaling about $3,300, to his city credit card during his first year in office, in what the newspaper said appeared to violate city policy. Broadnax initially defended the expenses, saying his schedule rarely allowed him to leave City Hall for lunch, but later said he would repay the city $3,780 for meals he had eaten alone.
