= John North Edy =

American civil engineer (1883–1952)

John North Edy (November 20, 1883 – May 10, 1952) was an American civil engineer and public administrator who served as the first city manager of Berkeley, Flint, Dallas, Houston, and Toledo. He was president of the International City Managers' Association and, in 1935, assistant director of the federal Bureau of the Budget under President Franklin D. Roosevelt. In Dallas he was known for strict budgetary control and for eliminating the city's deficit.

== Early life ==
Edy was born in Kimmswick, Missouri, and attended public schools in De Soto, Missouri, graduating from high school in 1901. At the University of Missouri he earned a bachelor's degree in civil engineering in 1905 and a graduate degree in the same field in 1909, played several sports, and joined Sigma Chi. He married Mary Jane Brown in 1907; they had one son.

His younger brother, Joseph Oliver Edy, was a confectioner who in 1928 co-founded the Oakland ice cream company now known as Dreyer's, which still sells under the Edy's name east of the Rocky Mountains.

== Career ==
=== Montana, Berkeley, and Flint ===
Edy's early career was in Montana. In Billings he worked for the county as a deputy surveyor and for the city as a construction inspector and assistant engineer. He joined Yellowstone County's engineering staff in 1916 and was elected county surveyor the next year. In 1918 he went to the Montana State Highway Commission, and by 1919 he was its chief engineer.

Berkeley hired Edy in 1923 as its first city manager, at $7,500 a year, and he stayed until 1930. While there he led the California City Managers' Association and, after a term as vice president, the International City Managers' Association. He also completed a master's degree in political science at the University of California in 1927, and later studied at Stanford University. In June 1930 Flint, Michigan, made him its first city manager, at $15,000, and he resigned the following year after voters elected a council hostile to the council-manager system.

=== Dallas ===
Edy became the first city manager of Dallas in April 1931, under the city's new council-manager charter, at a salary of $16,500. He inherited a budget overdraft of $1.2 million, imposed strict budgetary controls, reorganized the fire, police, health, and engineering departments, tightened enforcement of vice laws, and dismissed about a tenth of the city workforce. Within a year he had eliminated the deficit, reportedly cutting spending by about $2,000 a day; Time later credited him with saving the city $1,426,000 in operating expenses over three years. He pressed for lower utility rates and proposed an unpopular sewer-connection tax to help fund the Texas Centennial Exposition.

Supporters called him an "economy wizard" and opponents a "carpet-bagger," and he was the target of death threats. Henry Kucera, who became city attorney in 1935, later described him as "a wonderful organizer, but with no public relations at all. He argued with everybody." His administration also put city jobs under a civil service system, which limited the power of officeholders to hand out jobs as rewards.

In the 1935 election, the Catfish Club, drawn mostly from former city employees let go during his tenure, campaigned against the Citizens Charter Association slate chiefly by attacking Edy, and its candidates won by wide margins. Hal Moseley replaced him as city manager.

=== Federal service, Toledo, and Houston ===
In April 1935 President Roosevelt appointed Edy assistant director of the Bureau of the Budget.

Toledo voters had approved a council-manager amendment to the city charter in November 1934, by 33,229 votes to 28,014. It took effect on January 1, 1936, making Toledo one of 426 American cities with the plan by Time's count, along with Dublin. The council had recruited Edy the previous December, and he took office on January 13 as the city's first city manager, at $12,000 a year, ending the administration of Mayor Solon T. Klotz. As in Dallas, he was praised for his effectiveness and criticized as "too arbitrary and ... lacking in political finesse." He resigned on October 1, 1939, to become an administrative assistant in Washington to John M. Carmody, head of the Federal Works Agency, where his posts included assistant executive and budget officer.

In January 1943 Edy took office as the first city manager of Houston, where he began planning for major postwar public improvements. He resigned in December 1945 at the request of the city council, which feared that his unpopularity would endanger Houston's new council-manager system; Houston returned to a mayor-council government in 1947.

== Later life ==
After leaving public office Edy became president of the Industrial Road Equipment Corporation, a municipal contracting company in Houston. He was a member of the American Society of Civil Engineers and the National Municipal League. He died of heart disease in Houston on May 10, 1952; his ashes were inurned at Forest Lawn Memorial Park in Glendale, California.
