= Richard Knight (cricketer) =

English cricketer

Personal information
- Full name: Richard Knight
- Born: 8 May 1892; South Molton, Devon, England
- Died: 9 January 1960 (aged 67); Kewstoke, Somerset, England
- Batting: Right-handed
- Bowling: Unknown

Domestic team information
- Years: Team
- 1910–1913: Devon
- 1912: Cambridge University

Career statistics
| Competition | First-class |
|---|---|
| Matches | 4 |
| Runs scored | 101 |
| Batting average | 16.83 |
| 100s/50s | –/1 |
| Top score | 66 |
| Balls bowled | 334 |
| Wickets | 8 |
| Bowling average | 22.12 |
| 5 wickets in innings | – |
| 10 wickets in match | – |
| Best bowling | 4/23 |
| Catches/stumpings | 2/– |
- Source: Cricinfo, 12 October 2020

Richard Knight (8 May 1892 – 9 January 1960) was an English first-class cricketer.

The son of Charles Knight, he was born at South Molton in Devon. He was educated at St John's School, Leatherhead before going up to Christ's College, Cambridge. While studying at Cambridge, he made four appearances in first-class cricket for Cambridge University in 1912, which included playing in the two matches against the touring Australians and South Africans. He scored a total of 101 runs in these four matches, with his highest score of 66 coming against the South Africans. As a bowler he took 8 wickets at an average of 22.12, with best figures of 4 for 23. In addition to playing first-class cricket, Knight also played minor counties cricket for Devon from 1910 to 1913, making twenty appearances in the Minor Counties Championship. Knight died in January 1960 at Kewstoke, Somerset.
