= Mary Suhm =

American public administrator

Mary K. Suhm is an American public administrator who served as city manager of Dallas, Texas, from 2005 to 2013. She stepped down after 35 years with the city, the last eight as city manager. During her tenure she was credited with downtown expansion, the development of a convention center hotel, public safety gains, and work on the Trinity River corridor, and she oversaw the city's effort to house evacuees from Hurricane Katrina in 2005.Her agenda also drew sustained criticism, particularly over the proposed Trinity River toll road, a city landfill ordinance later struck down in federal court, and a natural gas drilling lease on city parkland that ultimately led to a multimillion-dollar judgment against the city.

== Early life and education ==
Suhm earned two master's degrees from the University of North Texas: a Master of Science in library science in 1974 and an M.B.A. in 1984. She has said the first degree allowed her to move from teaching into library work, and the second from library management into city administration; she completed both while working full time as a single mother.

== Career ==
Suhm began her working life as a schoolteacher in Carrollton and then worked at a library in Allen before joining the Dallas Public Library system in 1978, where she held her first management positions. By January 1985 she was serving as an assistant to Mayor Starke Taylor. She subsequently served as municipal court administrator, as the top civilian administrator in the Dallas Police Department (the first woman to hold that role), and as assistant city manager and first assistant city manager before being named city manager, the second woman to hold the position in Dallas.

=== City manager ===
As city manager she oversaw a workforce of roughly 13,000 and an annual budget of nearly $3 billion, and worked with eight mayors over the course of her career with the city. By 2013 her salary was $305,000 a year. She said her two main priorities on taking the job were reducing crime and growing the city's tax base, the latter through encouraging denser development; she also established a CityDesign Studio within City Hall to promote urban design principles. Crime, which had been the leading neighborhood complaint at the start of her tenure, declined over the period, in line with national trends. During the recession of 2007–2009 she made deep cuts to the city's payroll and spending.

Projects she helped bring about included the Omni Dallas Hotel and the Margaret Hunt Hill Bridge. She assembled a $480 million bond package to finance the Omni, a convention center hotel that earlier efforts had failed to deliver, and she and Mayor Tom Leppert saw it built during the recession. The proposal to commission Santiago Calatrava to design signature bridges over the Trinity River was hers; the Hill Bridge was the first of these to open, with the others delayed or in doubt because of cost. She also secured city bond funding for Dallas's first major downtown parks, including Klyde Warren Park, Main Street Garden Park and Civic Garden Park, and oversaw an agreement to build a championship golf course in southern Dallas. Her staff worked to advance the long-debated toll road inside the Trinity River levees, which had twice been backed by voters but remained unbuilt; she defended that work as consistent with the voters' decisions.

=== Controversies ===
Suhm's later years as city manager were marked by several controversies. Her information technology department was hit by two hiring scandals. An ordinance she had promoted as an environmental measure, directing privately hauled trash to the city-owned landfill, was criticized as a revenue measure arising from the 2010 budget crisis; it prompted protests and a federal lawsuit, and a federal judge struck it down as unconstitutional and in violation of the city charter.

She also came under fire over a 2008 gas drilling lease on city parkland, with opponents of drilling accusing her of misleading the public about how the lease came to be granted without the council's knowledge. Suhm denied lying, while acknowledging she would have handled some aspects differently; a majority of the council publicly backed her. According to D Magazine, the city had an ordinance prohibiting drilling on parkland at the time, but Suhm accepted $19 million from the drilling company and indicated she would seek council approval for the project; the arrangement remained undisclosed for about five years until council member Scott Griggs obtained the documents through an open records request. The company subsequently sued the city and won a judgment, and in January 2024 the City Council voted on issuing $55 million in bonds to satisfy it. D editor Tim Rogers described the episode as a mistake of Suhm's making. Council members Angela Hunt and later Scott Griggs were her most persistent critics, though both credited her with substantial achievements on her departure.

=== Resignation ===
Suhm announced her resignation in a memo to the Dallas City Council on May 16, 2013, describing her 35 years with the city as "a privilege and a joy." The announcement surprised many at City Hall. Then aged 66, she said no single factor prompted the decision, but that she had accomplished much of what she had set out to do and that eight years was long enough in the role. Her departure coincided with the seating of a new council that included several members who had been critical of her management.

Under a plan proposed by Mayor Mike Rawlings, she would leave the city manager post effective July 1, 2013, with First Assistant City Manager A. C. Gonzalez serving as interim city manager, and would remain on the payroll through the end of the year to work on the next budget, the commemoration of the 50th anniversary of the assassination of John F. Kennedy, and the Trinity River project. A search committee of the mayor and council members Dwaine Caraway, Monica Alonzo and Sheffie Kadane was to seek her successor. Rawlings called her one of the best city managers in the country, and Leppert described her as the most effective politician at City Hall. She ultimately remained with the city through January 2014 at Rawlings's request to complete the budget and other work.

== Honors ==
The University of North Texas named Suhm a Distinguished Alumna in 2008 and recognized her at its Emerald Eagle Honors in 2013.
