= Kim Tolbert =

American city manager

Kimberly Bizor Tolbert is an American public administrator who has been the city manager of Dallas, Texas, since January 22, 2025, after serving as interim city manager from May 2024. She is the first Black woman to hold the position and the first woman to hold it in more than a decade.

== Early career ==
Tolbert, a Texas native, holds a Bachelor of Arts in political science and a Master of Public Administration from the University of North Texas.

Tolbert began at Dallas City Hall as an intern and joined the city in 1998, working her way up over nearly a decade to assistant to the city manager and assistant director of the aviation department. From about 2008 to 2017 she held executive roles at the North Texas Tollway Authority. She returned to the city in 2017 as chief of staff and deputy city manager under city manager T. C. Broadnax.

== City manager ==
After Broadnax resigned in February 2024, the city council voted 12–2 to name Tolbert interim city manager; council members Cara Mendelsohn and Paul Ridley voted no, saying the appointment was rushed. On January 22, 2025, the council appointed her to the permanent post by a vote of 13–2. As city manager she prepares the city's roughly $5 billion budget and oversees its departments, including police and fire; under the city charter the position carries more authority than the mayor.

Her contract sets a base salary of $450,000, up from the $367,000 she had earned as interim, and has no fixed term. If the council removes her, which requires a two-thirds vote, she receives paid leave until she becomes eligible for a city pension, roughly two years after her appointment.

=== Budgets ===
In August 2025, Tolbert presented her first full budget, a balanced $5.2 billion biennial plan for fiscal years 2025–26 and 2026–27, up from $4.97 billion the previous year. It called for hiring 350 police recruits to bring the force to 3,424 sworn officers by the end of the 2025–26 fiscal year, its highest level since 2016, with a goal of 3,634 by the end of 2026–27, and reduced the property tax rate for the tenth consecutive year.

=== City Hall ===
On March 4, 2026, the council took up the future of Dallas City Hall, the I. M. Pei-designed building the city has occupied since 1978. After more than 100 members of the public spoke, the council debated for more than seven hours, and shortly after 1 a.m. voted to direct Tolbert to explore relocating the city's 311, 911, and emergency operations and to examine options for the building and its site. During the debate Tolbert told members that no final decision would be made that night, that the city had no financing plan for either renovating the building or moving, and that "we have not identified locations."

Later that month, Dallas Mavericks CEO Rick Welts told a Greater Dallas Planning Council panel that Tolbert had approached the team "over a year ago" about the City Hall site likely becoming available for a new arena, quoting her as saying the city could not afford to keep operating the building. Tolbert said the council had directed her to explore options for the site, including its disposition, and confirmed she had met with the Mavericks and the Dallas Stars about their futures in the city. Welts said days later that his remark had not captured the context of a longer conversation about several potential sites, in which Tolbert had said renovating City Hall could cost hundreds of millions of dollars; Tolbert said she had directed staff in mid-2025 to brief the council on the need to fund repairs to the building. The disclosure that talks had preceded the council's direction drew criticism from some council members. In June 2026 the Mavericks chose the former Valley View Center site in Far North Dallas instead.
