= Mr. Whippy Australia =

Australian ice cream franchise

- Type: Company and franchise
- Industry: Food; Retail; Direct service
- Products: Frozen yogurt; Soft serves; Beverages
- Parent: Dib Group
- Website: mrwhippy.com.au

Mr. Whippy Australia is a franchise of ice-cream vendors operating in Australia.

== History ==
The original Mr. Whippy in the United Kingdom franchised internationally to Australia in 1962 by sending ten vans on a ship from Southampton to Sydney, following success, a second batch was set the year after, consisting of twenty-four vans. The company's franchise in Australia continued until the mid-1970s, after which the physical vehicle fleet was sold to private operators. During the franchise period from Mr. Whippy in the UK, around 200 Commer Karrier vans were imported from the UK to Australia.

In 1982, the trademark "Mr Whippy" was registered in Australia by ice cream parlour company Mr Whippy Pty Ltd. In 2000 the Franchised Food Company bought the company with 30 retail outlets on Australia’s east coast. In 2019, Dib Group purchased the company with plans to expand the brand to Metro Petroleum locations, introducing Mr. Whippy Thick shakes and Slush.

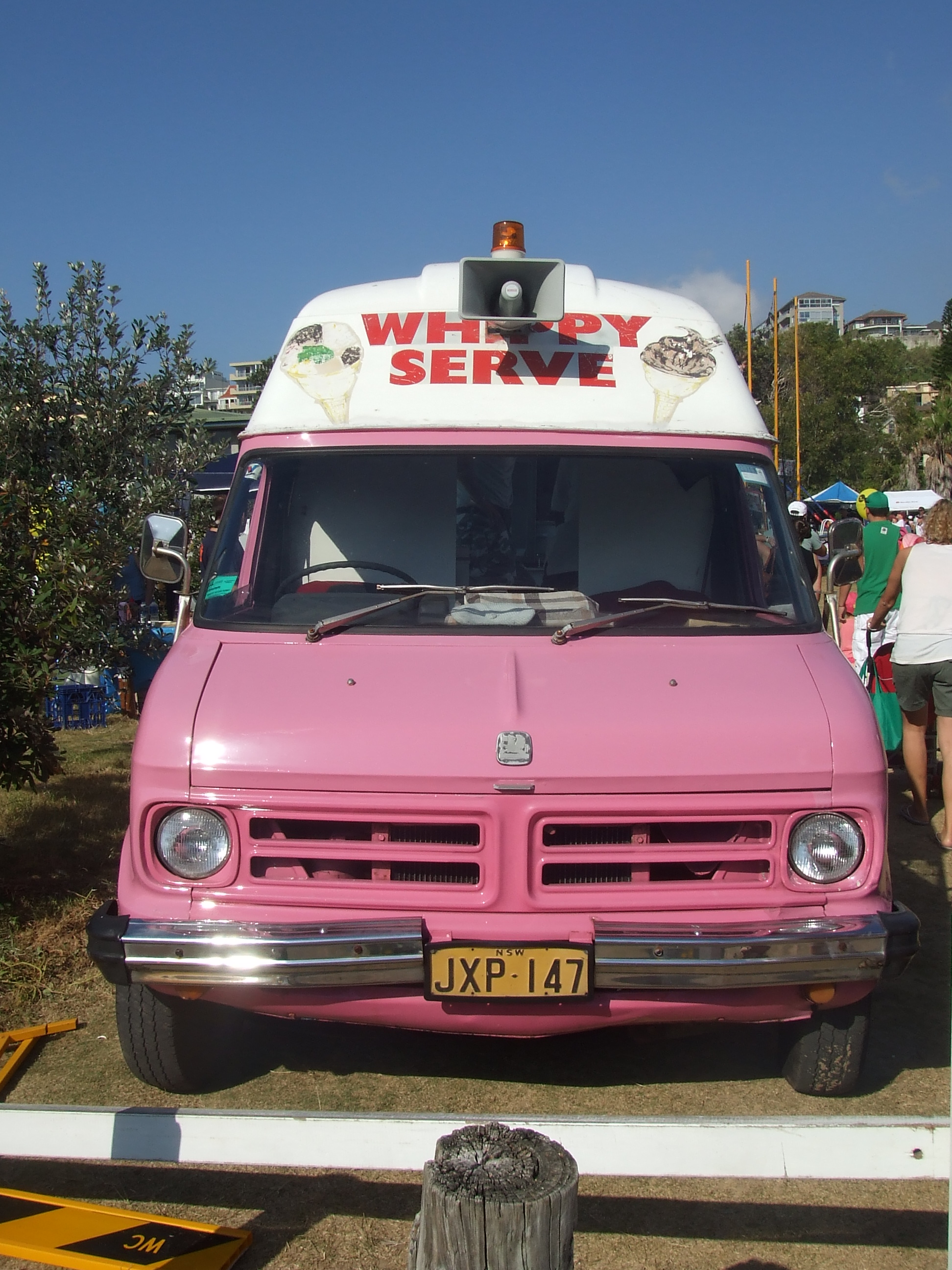
Vintage Bedford CF Mr Whippy van in Sydney, Australia, in 2010

== See also ==
- Dairy farming in Australia
