= Dallas Citizens Council =

Civic organization of business leaders in Dallas, Texas

- Abbreviation: DCC
- Formation: November 12, 1937; 88 years ago
- Founder: Robert L. Thornton
- Type: Civic organization
- Headquarters: 1601 Elm Street, Dallas, Texas, U.S.
- Members: More than 170
- Chief executive officer: W. Kelvin Walker
- Chairman: John Gates
- Website: dallascitizenscouncil.org

The Dallas Citizens Council (DCC) is a civic organization in Dallas, Texas, composed of the heads of the city's largest businesses.

Founded in 1937 by banker Robert L. Thornton, it exerted a strong influence over the city's development and politics through the 1970s, backing a long series of bond campaigns, infrastructure projects, and civic institutions. At the height of its power it worked through affiliated organizations to elect the great majority of the city council and to choose nearly every mayor. Critics characterized it as an exclusive, behind-the-scenes oligarchy, a reputation that drew national attention after the assassination of John F. Kennedy in 1963. As its grip on city politics loosened, beginning in the late 1970s the council began broadening its membership and took on a more public role. As of 2026 the council has more than 170 members and describes its focus as public policy in four areas: education, mobility, housing, and quality of life.

== History ==
=== Founding ===
The council grew out of the campaign that brought the Texas to Dallas in 1936. Thornton, a Dallas banker and civic promoter who had led that effort, proposed a standing body of business leaders modeled on the same principle: it would admit only the heads of major local companies, so that members could commit their firms' money and personnel to shared goals on the spot, without seeking approval from anyone else. Thornton first took the idea to the heads of the city's two largest banks, Nathan Adams of First National and Fred F. Florence of Republic National; what he wanted, as he put it, were men who could say yes or no themselves rather than defer to others. Adams and Florence, who had worked with Thornton on the Centennial, were among the founders and became central figures in the new group.

Thornton and fourteen other business leaders held the charter meeting on November 12, 1937, at the Baker Hotel in downtown Dallas. After adopting a charter and bylaws, the members chose Charles F. O'Donnell as the council's first president and Thornton as vice president. The charter empowered the council to "study and confer and act upon" any matter deemed to affect the welfare of the city.

=== Influence in city government ===
The council was nominally nonpartisan and did not endorse candidates in local races, though individual members were free to do so. In practice its outlook was conservative and oriented toward business. The membership rules shaped that character: because practicing lawyers, physicians, educators, journalists, and labor leaders were judged to lack the needed authority over their own institutions, they were barred from joining, and their sectors went unrepresented at council meetings. Within the membership, the heads of banks and insurance companies held a disproportionate share of leadership positions.

In its early decades, effective control of the council rested with a small core—the three leading bankers and roughly half a dozen other decision-makers—with another twenty or so members brought in when a large financial commitment was at stake. The big downtown banks remained the center of the organization, joined by the heads of the utilities, the insurance companies, the major retailers, and the two newspapers. Admission to this inner circle required not only heading a large institution but also a record of service in the city's established civic bodies, such as the United Way and the Chamber of Commerce.

The DCC worked closely with the Citizens Charter Association (CCA), the political organization that slated candidates for mayor and the city council. The two groups overlapped heavily in membership and in personal and business ties, and DCC members had a hand in choosing the CCA's slates. The result was a durable relationship between the council and city hall. Through the CCA and other affiliated bodies, including the Committee for Good Schools and the United Way, the council in its heyday elected more than ninety percent of the city council, chose all but two mayors, controlled the school board, and passed judgment on every major civic fund drive. Several Dallas mayors were DCC members during their terms: Jean Baptiste Adoue (1951–1953), Thornton himself (1953–1961), Earle Cabell (1961–1964), J. Erik Jonsson (1964–1971), Robert Folsom (1976–1981), Jack Evans (1981–1983), and Thomas C. Leppert (2007–2011). Mayors Starke Taylor (1985–1987) and Ron Kirk (1995–2001) joined after leaving office.

The council also organized fundraising for civic causes and ran public relations campaigns on behalf of bond measures it favored; its support was often decisive. Executives of The Dallas Morning News and the Dallas Times Herald were members, and could steer their newspapers—and later their television stations—toward council priorities through editorial endorsements or the framing of coverage. With both publishers inside the organization, the council was able to shape local news coverage of its causes and to blunt criticism.

=== Civic projects ===
An early council goal was a new master plan for Dallas that would take in the surrounding communities. In 1943 the city council hired Harland Bartholomew to prepare such a plan for Greater Dallas; the resulting Bartholomew Plan closely tracked the DCC's vision.

Over the following decades the council promoted the construction of the Dallas Memorial Auditorium (later part of the Kay Bailey Hutchison Convention Center) and Victory Park, and backed measures to relieve traffic congestion, including Central Expressway and Dallas Area Rapid Transit. It helped raise the funds to establish the University of Texas Southwestern Medical School at Dallas, worked with the Dallas Independent School District to create what is now Dallas College, and took part in various efforts to improve the district's schools, including a successful campaign for statewide reform of education funding. It pressed for the improvement and expansion of Dallas Love Field and, to protect that municipal airport's business, opposed the creation of Dallas Fort Worth International Airport. The Dallas Morning News, by contrast, has credited the council with leading the push for the airport's construction, along with Central Expressway, school desegregation, the arts, and the city's sports arenas.

The council's own account of its history dates several of these efforts to its first years. In 1938 it proposed Central Expressway, a downtown auditorium, and a master plan for Greater Dallas, and put a $300,000 bond program for a new Love Field terminal before the city council, which voters later approved. The first segment of Central Expressway opened in 1949, and the Memorial Auditorium was completed in 1957. In 1943 the council and the Chamber of Commerce pledged to raise $1.5 million toward the new medical school. A council water-supply committee chaired by Herbert Marcus brought civic and city officials together in 1948 to address a water shortage, leading to a $22.4 million bond program for water supply, sewers, and street paving. The council's push for a modern downtown hotel was answered in 1956 by the Statler Hilton. In 1964 it urged the county to issue $20.5 million in bonds for an outer loop that became the LBJ Freeway, and a committee headed by R. L. Thornton Jr. worked with the school district and the chamber on the junior college system that became Dallas College.

During the 1950s the council—and founding member Karl Hoblitzelle in particular—worked to ease the city's housing shortage for Black residents, efforts that contributed substantially to the creation of the Hamilton Park neighborhood. The DCC also supported the city's arts institutions, mounting repeated fund drives to sustain the Dallas Symphony Orchestra and establishing the Dallas Business Committee for the Arts. By its own account the council began its financial support of the symphony in 1941, backed the founding of the Dallas Opera in 1957, and in 1967 invited the National Urban League to open a Dallas chapter, providing its initial funding.

Not every initiative succeeded. The council's growth-oriented approach, which welcomed federal spending, sometimes ran into the region's growing small-government conservatism; that tension stalled its attempt to revitalize West Dallas in the late 1950s. A campaign to annex Highland Park and University Park into Dallas also failed when voters in those cities rejected it.

=== Desegregation ===
After the highly publicized confrontations over school desegregation in Little Rock and New Orleans, the council took an active role in desegregating Dallas without disorder. According to the council, it and the chamber met with local and national Black leaders and the NAACP in 1960 to discuss desegregation, and in 1961 its members pressed for the desegregation of department stores, lunch counters, hotels, restaurants, and theaters as well as schools. In 1961, with school desegregation scheduled for that fall, DCC president C. A. Tatum Jr. chaired a biracial committee of council members and Black community leaders. The committee ran a public relations campaign urging compliance and used members' influence to loosen restrictions on Black patrons at businesses across the city. It also worked to restrain Black activism during the period, in order to avoid controversies that might provoke white residents. Council member Sam R. Bloom, an advertising executive, produced the widely screened film Dallas at the Crossroads (1961), which argued that the city's continued economic growth depended on preserving its reputation. Dallas drew national praise for its peaceful desegregation, and local observers credited the council.

Journalist Jim Schutze offered a more critical account in The Accommodation: The Politics of Race in an American City (1987), which portrayed the council as the principal architect of the city's avoidance of the civil rights movement. In Schutze's telling, white business leaders responded to the bombings of Black homes in South Dallas and other racial conflict in the 1950s not by confronting discrimination directly but by courting a small group of Black ministers and creating Hamilton Park as a segregated enclave for middle-class Black families, leaving poorer Black residents without remedy. Schutze has said he was told that Alex Bickley, then the council's executive director, pressed the book's original publisher, Taylor Publishing, to drop it; Taylor cited weak presales. The book appeared in a small edition from Lyle Stuart, became scarce, and was reissued by Deep Vellum Publishing in 2021.

=== Kennedy assassination and aftermath ===
Complaints from younger Dallas businessmen about the council's exclusivity led to the creation of the Dallas Assembly in 1962, open to businessmen between the ages of 25 and 50. Thornton organized the Assembly as a training ground for future members of the council. In 1963 the DCC, the Dallas Assembly, and the Graduate Research Center of the Southwest (which Jonsson had co-founded) were selected to co-host the luncheon for President John F. Kennedy on November 22. Jonsson, then the council's president, was among those who greeted the president and Mrs. Kennedy on their arrival at Love Field. A month earlier, United Nations ambassador Adlai Stevenson had been attacked by a right-wing crowd in Dallas, embarrassing the city's leadership, and council members were anxious that the president's visit go smoothly. Former DCC president Stanley Marcus went so far as to urge Kennedy to leave Dallas off his Texas itinerary. Kennedy came as planned and was assassinated on the way to the luncheon.

The assassination brought the council its first sustained scrutiny from outside media, which portrayed it as an exclusionary oligarchy directing Dallas politics from behind the scenes. The DCC set out to repair the city's image. One step was to unseat Bruce Alger, the congressman whose record had done much to give Dallas a reactionary reputation; Cabell resigned as mayor to run against Alger and defeated him in 1964. To fill the vacancy, the six CCA members of the city council appointed Jonsson, a former DCC president, without consulting the remaining council members or the public—a move that reinforced the council's image as secretive and undemocratic. Jonsson's selection was simply announced in the morning newspaper; some council members, who under the city charter were supposed to make the choice, said afterward that they had not been informed. Jonsson went on to win several terms, but in the years after the assassination the hold of business elites on city politics weakened, and after Jonsson retired in 1971 the CCA never elected another mayor.

=== Decline of influence ===
By the early 1970s the council's control over city affairs was visibly eroding. In 1971 Wes Wise, a television sportscaster with no corporate position and no ties to the major civic organizations, ran for mayor against the establishment's chosen candidate, Avery Mays, and won decisively. The following year voters rejected by a wide margin a bond program to canalize the Trinity River—a project the city's business leadership had pursued for decades and regarded as its last great undertaking. The council's leaders, accustomed to having bond proposals ratified, were taken by surprise.

Several structural changes lay behind the shift. The two largest Dallas banks had reorganized as statewide holding companies in the early 1970s, dividing their attention among many Texas cities and making local political involvement less attractive. Large family-owned firms were giving way to corporations with outside parents and shareholders, so that the chief executive who could commit his company on his own authority was becoming rare. Rapid in-migration from outside Texas brought residents with no attachment to the old leadership, and the move toward single-member districts opened the city council to candidates who had never needed the establishment's blessing. The Dallas Assembly, meanwhile, had largely lapsed as a pipeline for new leaders. A study based on interviews conducted in 1961 had identified seven men at the apex of the city's power structure; by 1974, two of them had died and three had faded from prominence, leaving only two in place.

=== Reforms since 1976 ===
Seeking to shed its reputation as a clandestine body serving only business interests, the council in the summer of 1976 hired attorney Alex Bickley to revitalize it. Under Bickley the organization became more structured, creating committees focused on particular issues, and it widened its membership. Frank Cuellar Sr., chairman of the El Chico restaurant company, had become the first Hispanic member in 1971. Mary C. Crowley, founder of Home Interiors and Gifts, became the first woman member in 1977. In 1981 lawyers were admitted for the first time, and Comer Cottrell, founder of the hair-care company Pro-Line, became the council's first African American member. R. Jan LeCroy, president from 1988 to 1998, made a deliberate effort to recruit more women and minorities. One obstacle was cost: annual dues, set at $25 at the founding, had by the 1980s grown too expensive for smaller firms. The council introduced tiered dues based on company size, which opened membership to the owners of smaller businesses, among whom women and minorities were more common. During this period the DCC engaged more directly with racial inequality in the city and with expanding economic opportunity.

The council's activities in the 1980s and 1990s, as it recounts them, included a 1983 fundraising campaign led by Walt Humann and other board members for the creation of DART, and support for the system's first light rail line in 1993; the founding of the Dallas Business Committee for the Arts in 1987, which the council credits with a role in developing the downtown Arts District; and financial backing in 1990 for the public campaign for the 14-1 plan, which replaced at-large council seats with single-member districts. In 1993 council member Robert Hoffman led the effort to win city council approval of the Dallas Plan, a long-range growth and spending framework that included the Trinity River Corridor. The council supported the city's negotiations in 1997 for the arena that became the American Airlines Center, and in 1998 proposed and backed the bond campaign for Trinity River flood control, recreation, transportation, and the purchase of the Great Trinity Forest.

The council also began to act more openly in local politics, endorsing Ron Kirk for mayor in 1995. In December 2018, however, it announced that it would again stop endorsing candidates in local elections. The decision followed a string of defeats for candidates the council had supported in recent years, which had limited its ability to advance its agenda.

=== 21st century ===
In 2000 former council chairman Bill Solomon and Fort Worth's John Roach led a group of about thirty business and civic leaders from both cities in resolving the dispute over the Wright Amendment, an agreement that allowed Dallas and Fort Worth to issue revenue bonds for DFW Airport's capital program. Over the following decade, according to its own account, the council commissioned a study of research funding for North Texas universities that led to the Texas Research Alliance (2002), issued a position paper on public school finance (2003), fought to keep the North Texas Tollway Authority independent and to let it build State Highway 121 as a toll road (2007–2008), supported the $747 million bond for the new Parkland Memorial Hospital (2008), and, under former chairman Ray Hunt, campaigned for the 2009 referendum approving the city-owned convention center hotel that became the Omni Dallas Hotel.

By 2013 the council had about 170 members, chief executives who each paid $10,000 a year in dues, and maintained ties to political action committees and the Dallas Regional Chamber. Writing in D Magazine that year, Eric Celeste argued that its reputation as the city's hidden hand was out of date. He attributed the loss of power to two developments of the 1970s: the adoption of single-member council districts, and the rise of middle-class Republicans who campaigned against the conservative Democrats then dominant in the council. He added that the council, having spent some fifteen years working within the political system rather than around it, was poorly suited to public advocacy. The council's longtime president, Donna Halstead, acknowledged that the organization had never been good at public relations, and said it no longer sought the kind of control over the city it once held. She cited its role in a sharp increase in research funding at the University of Texas at Dallas and in the expansion of State Highway 121. That year a former chairman, Don Williams, publicly broke with the council over its support for Dallas ISD superintendent [Mike Miles.

In the 2010s the council backed statewide ballot measures directing rainy-day funds to water infrastructure (2013) and increasing transportation funding (2014), a city charter amendment raising council salaries (2014), the $1.6 billion Dallas ISD bond (2015), and the city's $1.1 billion bond program (2017). In 2017 it organized business support for legislation to rescue the Dallas Police and Fire Pension System and, with many of its members, opposed the state's proposed "bathroom bill." In 2019 it supported the $1.1 billion Dallas College bond, school finance reform under House Bill 3, and the Proposition A measure to fund renovation of Fair Park and the convention center; it backed a second Proposition A in 2022 for the convention center's expansion. During 2020 the council took part in Dallas Forward, a small-business recovery effort, and the Dallas Thrives living-wage initiative, and joined the campaign for the $3.5 billion Dallas ISD bond. It supported the city's $1.25 billion bond election in 2024 and in 2025 helped launch Safe in the City, a downtown public-safety program.

In March 2019 the council, then a group of about 150 business leaders, named W. Kelvin Walker as its chief executive—the first African American to hold the position in the organization's history. Walker had opened the Dallas office of RLJ Equity Partners in 2015 and before that spent sixteen years at 21st Century Group, a private equity firm co-founded by former Dallas city manager John Ware; he had also served on the boards of Methodist Health System and the YMCA of Metropolitan Dallas. Council chairman Fred Perpall, chief executive of the Beck Group, said the choice reflected a deliberate effort to work more collaboratively with other civic organizations. Walker said the council would pursue its priorities—education, affordable housing, and transportation—with whoever won that year's mayoral election rather than backing a candidate.

== Organization ==
The council describes its purpose as leading and serving "in the moments that matter the most" for Dallas, and sets out three strategic priorities: promoting inclusive growth through policy work in education, mobility, housing, and quality of life; acting as the business community's first responders; and supporting collaboration among civic organizations. Its membership comprises chief executives and other senior business leaders of the Dallas area, numbering about 150 in 2019 and more than 170 as of 2026.

The organization is governed by a board of directors and a slate of officers—chairman, chairman-elect, secretary/treasurer, and immediate past chair—together with a chief executive officer. An executive committee consists of the officers and the chairs of three standing committees: Communications, Issues Analysis, and Membership and Programs. As of 2026 the chairman is John Gates of JLL, with G. Brint Ryan as chairman-elect, Hunter Hunt of Hunt Energy as secretary/treasurer, Arcilia Acosta as immediate past chair, and W. Kelvin Walker as CEO. Former mayor Ron Kirk sits on the board. The council's annual meeting serves both to present its policy priorities and as a fundraising event, with sponsorships underwriting its projects.

== Notable members ==
Beyond the founders and the mayors noted above, influential members have included James W. Aston, John W. Carpenter, Robert Brooks Cullum, Ted Dealey, Walt Humann, Les T. Potter, John M. Stemmons, and John E. Mitchell Jr. Other notable members include Texas governor William P. Clements Jr.; Roger Staubach, the former Dallas Cowboys quarterback and commercial real estate developer; and Dick Cheney, who joined as a Halliburton executive before becoming vice president of the United States.

== See also ==
- Citizens Charter Association
- History of Dallas
