= Richard Knight Jr. =

Richard Knight Jr. (May 31, 1945 – November 22, 2021) was an American public administrator and businessman who was city manager of Dallas from 1986 to 1990, the first Black person to hold the post. He had earlier been town manager of Carrboro, North Carolina, where he was the first Black city manager in North Carolina.

== Early life and education ==
Knight was born in rural Georgia, the only child of Freddie (Miller) Knight and Richard Knight Sr., an automobile salesman, and grew up in Fort Valley among an extended family. He began pumping gas at one of his uncle's two service stations at age twelve and was managing both by eighteen. At his segregated high school he played football, ran track, and played trumpet in the band.

He entered Fort Valley State College as a music major before switching to political science and economics, graduating in 1968. He spent a year at Yale University on a Ford Foundation fellowship, where he met and married Mavis Best. In 1969 he began graduate study in political science at Atlanta University, but was drafted into the United States Army and served in Vietnam as a communications specialist until his discharge in 1971.

== Early career ==
After the army, Knight directed a prison rehabilitation program in North Carolina, and in 1972 became assistant to the city manager of Durham. In 1976 he completed a master's degree in public administration at the University of North Carolina and became town manager of Carrboro, a mostly white, working-class suburb of Chapel Hill with a reputation for turning over its managers. Under his administration the town held its first bond election, adopted its first long-range financial plan, and saw its first downtown development in more than twenty years.

In 1980 he moved to Gainesville, Florida, (Note: The Handbook of Texas describes his Gainesville post as deputy city manager; the 1988 D Magazine profile and later biographical listings describe it as city manager.) and was elected a vice president of the International City Management Association. At an association conference in Salado, Texas, he met Dallas city manager Charles Anderson, who spent about a year persuading him to come to Dallas.

== Dallas ==
Knight joined Anderson's staff in 1982 as an assistant city manager. When Anderson left in 1986 to head Dallas Area Rapid Transit, Knight initially planned to follow him there as his deputy, but late in the search for Anderson's successor the city council asked to interview him, and on December 16, 1986, it unanimously chose him over the other finalists, including deputy city manager Camille Cates Barnett. He was the first city manager since Dallas adopted the council–manager system in 1931 who was not a white man; his starting salary was $125,000.

While still serving on an interim basis, Knight temporarily moved Police Chief Billy Prince into the city manager's office as an acting assistant city manager. The announcement came days after police shot and killed Etta Collins, an elderly Black woman who had called them to report a possible break-in at a neighbor's home, and amid a series of other police shootings; it drew heavy public criticism, and council member Diane Ragsdale repeatedly faulted Knight for moving too slowly on problems in the police department. Knight later hired Mack Vines, the first police chief Dallas had recruited from outside the department, under whom the number of police shootings fell.

Knight took office during an economic downturn that cut into city revenues, and in his first year proposed a tax increase to offset them. He revived a motto from previous city manager Scott McDonald, "The Only Reason You and I Are Here Is To Assist The People of Dallas", and had it printed on city stationery. Over his tenure he oversaw annual budgets of more than $1 billion and more than 13,000 employees, and led capital projects including the Morton H. Meyerson Symphony Center and expansions of the Dallas Convention Center and the Cotton Bowl. He was credited with increasing minority hiring and promotion in city government and with improving relations between the police and minority communities.

== Later career ==
Knight resigned in 1990 to join Caltex, where he spent more than eight years, including in management roles in Singapore. He later founded the oil distributor KnightCo Oil Company and Knight Waste Services, and chaired Pegasus Texas Construction. He chaired the boards of the State Fair of Texas and Children's Medical Center of Dallas, and served on the boards of regents of Texas Southern University and the University of North Texas.

== Death ==
Knight died in Dallas on November 22, 2021, and was buried at Restland Memorial Park. He was survived by his wife and their three sons.
