= Robert L. Thornton =

American banker and politician from Texas (1880–1964)

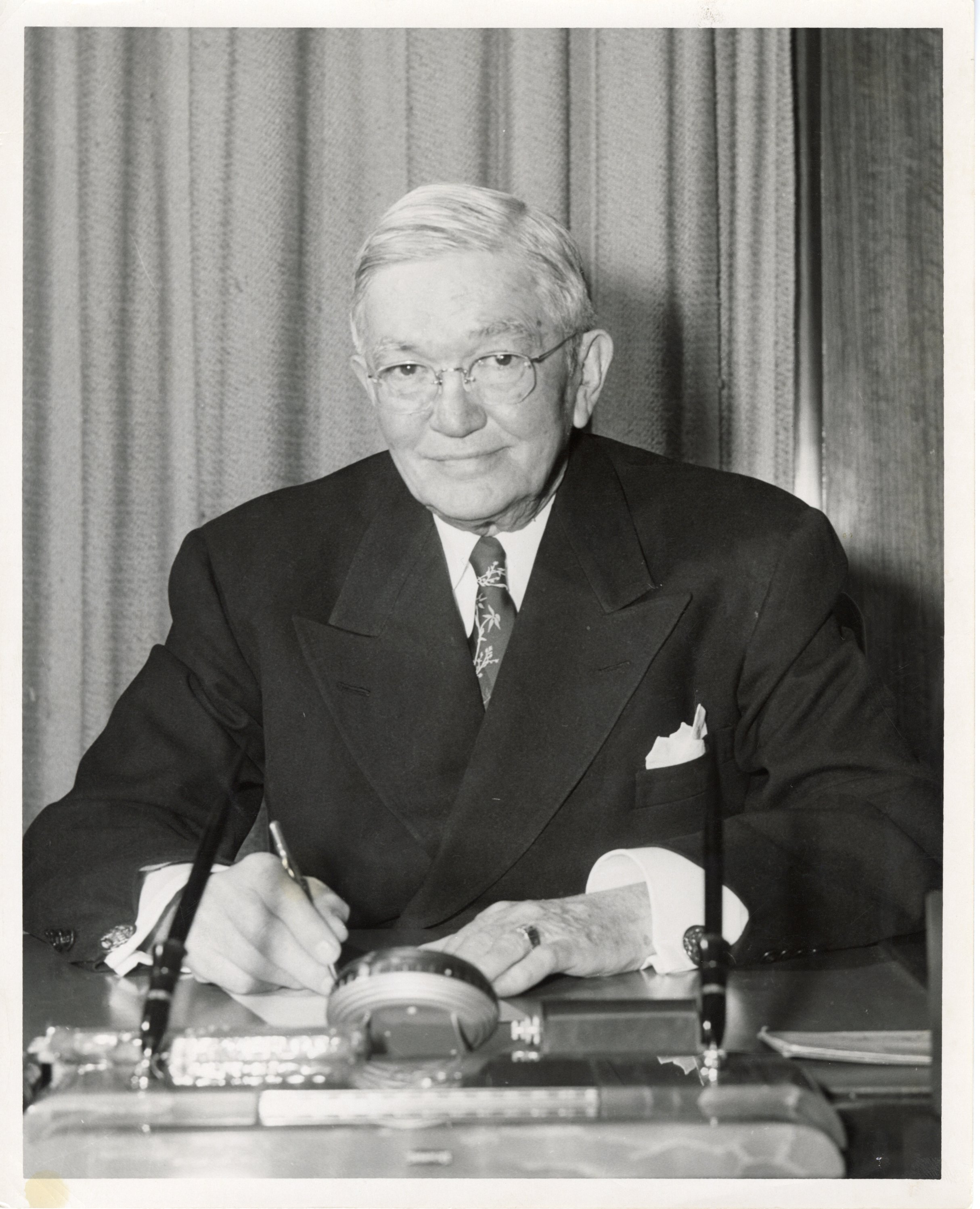
- Thornton in 1953

47th Mayor of Dallas
- In office 1953–1961
- Preceded by: Jean Baptiste Adoue
- Succeeded by: Earle Cabell

Personal details
- Born: Robert Lee Thornton; August 10, 1880 Hamilton County, Texas, U.S.
- Died: February 15, 1964 (aged 83) Dallas, Texas, U.S.
- Spouse: Mary Metta Stiles (m. 1905)
- Children: 4

Robert Lee Thornton (often R. L. Thornton; August 10, 1880 – February 15, 1964) was an American banker and politician who served as the 47th mayor of Dallas from 1953 to 1961. A child of tenant farmers, Thornton's early years were divided between school and farm labor. After holding several jobs and starting two unsuccessful business ventures, Thornton began a banking operation in Dallas in 1916. The bank progressed to be a Texas-wide institution, and by 1923 it had a national charter. Thornton served as president (1916–1947) and board chairman (1947–1964) of the bank he founded, the Mercantile Bank and Trust Co.

Thornton became a prominent businessman and community figure, serving as president of the Dallas Chamber of Commerce from 1933 to 1936, and as president of the State Fair of Texas from 1945 to 1960. He played a major part in securing the Texas Centennial Exposition for Dallas. From 1953 to 1961, Thornton served as mayor of Dallas. His vigorous promotion of the city and its development earned him the soubriquet Mr. Dallas in the media. His avuncular and countryfied manner saw him often referred to and addressed as Uncle Bob by locals and associates.

Beginning in 1994, claims that Thornton had been a Ku Klux Klan member in the early 1920s have arisen. Records of any Klan association are scant and have been contested. His family argue that although Thornton was a highly scrutinized public figure, as mayor and prominent business leader, no allegations of Klan affiliation surfaced during his lifetime, nor for thirty years after his death. Thornton's involvement in the city's desegregation and civil rights matters in the 1950s and 60s provided an opening for criticism from African American and other civil rights campaigners; however there are no contemporary, nor later, accusations on record, prior to the one surfacing in 1994.

Thornton married in 1905 and settled in Dallas with his wife, where they raised four children. Thornton died in 1964. Various roads and places in Dallas are named for him. Since the 1990s there have been intermittent calls for these place names to be changed on the basis of Thornton's perceived involvement with the Klan. Although little firm evidence of such involvement appears to exist, the claim of his membership is repeated from time-to-time in various publications.

== Early years ==
Robert Lee Thornton was born to tenant farmer William Travis Thornton and Polly Ann (née Weatherby) in a sod-roofed, half-dugout in Hamilton County, Texas, near Hico. His childhood time was divided between farm work, such as picking cotton, and attending school. He discontinued schooling at the eighth grade because his family needed him to work full-time farming. Formal business education was limited to an eight-week bookkeeping course at the Metropolitan Business College in Dallas. His first visit to Dallas was as an eight-year-old; he traveled by wagon with his father and a brother to visit the State Fair of Texas. The experience made a life-long impression: his involvement with the State Fair, and Dallas, lasted for more than 75 years.

== Business career ==
Other than picking cotton, Thornton's first job was as an $18-a-month store clerk in Heelstring (now Bristol) in Ellis County, Texas. Thornton then worked as a traveling candy salesman, supplying the Oklahoma Indian Territory. By 1912, Thornton returned to Dallas and became involved in two business ventures – a bookstore and a mortgage banking company – both of which were unsuccessful.

In 1916, at the age of 36, with loans from family and friends, he organized a private bank in Dallas in an 18-foot (5.5 m) office that had formerly housed the Blue Goose restaurant. It was from this first successful venture that Thornton launched his four-decade banking career as president of Stiles, Thornton, and Lund, which eventually would become the third-largest bank in Dallas. A year later, the bank reorganized as the Dallas County State Bank.

Many of Dallas' business leaders joined Thornton on the bank's board of directors. They included former Dallas mayor W. M. Holland, business leaders John W. Carpenter, Jewish business leader Julius Schepps, Catholic-community leader John Vilbig Jr., and Sanger–Harris department store general manager Charles L. Sanger. Thornton's fellow bankers recognized his business talent early in his career when they elected him president of the Texas Bankers Association in 1924–1925.

By 1923 they had outgrown the name "Dallas County State Bank" and became the "Mercantile Bank and Trust Co.", with a national charter. Two years later, the bank's capital hit the $1 million mark. Thornton served as president from 1916 to 1947, when he became chairman of the board until 1964. It would eventually become MCorp Bank through a merger and was then acquired by Bank One Corporation. The current successor is JPMorgan Chase & Co., who acquired Bank One in 2004.

== Civic leader ==
Shortly after Dallas County State Bank opened, Thornton joined the Dallas Chamber of Commerce, serving as president of the Chamber from 1933 to 1936. In 1923, he was named to the Dallas Plan Commission and later to the economic development organization, Industrial Dallas, Inc. that toured the Southwest encouraging businesses to move to Dallas.

He served as a member of the board of directors of a range of Dallas organizations. They included nonprofits: Children's Development Center, Greater Dallas Council of Churches, Texas Research Foundation, Scottish Rite Hospital, and the Southwestern Medical Foundation, as well as the citizens' advisory Trinity Improvement Authority, and the Texas Turnpike Authority agency. He volunteered to head the World War II Dallas War Chest to raise money through war bonds, chaired the Big Gifts division for the Dallas County United Fund, and chaired the campaign to approve the Dallas County courthouse complex. His greatest love was Dallas' Fair Park. He spent more than three decades involved with the [city-owned] park and the State Fair of Texas beginning with his election to the Fair board in 1929. He became chairman in 1945, serving until 1960, when he was elected board president.

In 1933, while serving as chairman of the Chamber of Commerce, he joined with his close friend Fred Florence of Republic Bank and Nathan Adams of First National Bank to pursue hosting the Texas Centennial and Exposition at Fair Park in 1936. The first world's fair in the Southwest hosted more than six million people including U.S. President Franklin D. Roosevelt, and was credited with cushioning Dallas from the Great Depression. According to historian Michael V. Hazel, "The man most responsible for securing the central Centennial Exposition for Dallas was Robert L. Thornton, head of the Mercantile Bank." In his history of the Dallas Citizens Council, author Darwin Payne noted: "Despite financial losses, the Centennial was the crowning event in the city's history. The public relations value alone was incalculable, and the economic benefits enormous." Payne wrote: "Dallas had become a different city, different in self-awareness as well as in its new national image as a prosperous, sophisticated city. That image was relayed to the nation in glowing articles in such prestigious publications as Fortune and Atlantic Monthly. Dallas almost overnight became Big D."

To host the Centennial, Dallas leaders promised to raise millions of dollars for the effort. According to The New York Times, "The businessmen of the city had worked hard to raise $3.5 million (Note: According to The Dallas Morning News, records indicate the actual bid was $7.7 million.) for the event, but the experience had shown them how loosely organized their city was." Thornton told the Times that committee members "had to report back to their companies before making financial commitments. We needed people who could say 'yes' or 'no' right away to determine if a project could be done quickly and efficiently". In 1937 this concern drove Thornton to organize the Dallas Citizens Council (not to be confused with the "White Citizens Councils in the South") made up of only the chief executive officers and decision-makers in Dallas. Since that time, the Council has put its collective money and expertise into projects deemed important for the city.

In his book, Big D: Triumphs and Troubles of an American Supercity in the 20th Century, Darwin Payne wrote: "Thornton was widely recognized as 'Mr. Dallas' by the 1950s. His folksy, avuncular ways earned him alternately the affectionate title of Uncle Bob", as he never forgot his country boy roots. A banker who was a natural salesman with energy and vision, R. L. Thornton sold Dallas to businesses across the nation and helped build Dallas into a major metropolitan area. "City-building", he said, "is just a privilege of citizenship." Through his leadership at the State Fair of Texas he made Dallas the Southwestern hub of entertainment and helped develop the State Fair of Texas into one of the largest in the world.

During his career, he received awards and honors, including the Linz Award for outstanding civic contributions (1947), the Sales Executive Club's Number 1 Salesman of Dallas award (1948), the Greater Dallas Planning Council's Distinguished Citizen Award (1955), the Press Club's Headliner of the Year award (1955), the Man of Vision Award from the Dallas Chapter of the American Institute of Architects (1959), and an honorary doctor of humanities degree from the University of Dallas (1963).

== Mayor of Dallas ==
Early in 1953, Dallas Mayor J. B. Adoue Jr. announced he would not seek reelection. The city was struggling with rapid economic growth challenges amid a prolonged drought that meant a severe water shortage. City leaders launched an effort to draft the 72-year-old Thornton for mayor. The city's business leadership was clearly in Thornton's corner, and the draft movement gained momentum throughout the city. His support was broad-based, and The Dallas Morning News reported that "Thornton has won wide respect among Dallas Negroes" and quoted the Rev. E. C. Estell, pastor of Dallas' largest African American church, as saying: "I do not know of any man who can serve our situation better ... we must have a man like Thornton to lead us."

On February 10, Thornton accepted the draft and agreed to run for Mayor of Dallas in the April election. The Dallas Morning News reported that he had no desire to hold public office, but he had "never turned down a job for my city". He won the election with 69.5% of the vote, and at his first Council meeting, he said: "This city government will govern for everyone alike. Dallas has no second-class citizens. All are created equal and will be treated equal – the rich, the poor, the high, the low." Thornton emphasized effective, businesslike, and open government, announcing that all City decisions would be made in public. "He instructed the City Manager to advise all department heads that utmost courtesy be shown all citizens, with positively no exceptions."

Six months later, Thornton saw the Statler Hotel break ground in downtown Dallas. It would be the largest hotel in the Southwest and kicked off Thornton's plan of "Keep the Dirt Flyin’". Major municipal projects completed during his eight years in office included a new downtown library, a new city hall annex, construction of the Memorial Auditorium, and expansion of Dallas Love Field with a new passenger terminal. To ameliorate the devastating and prolonged droughts in North Texas, Thornton launched the construction of Lake Tawakoni and Lake Ray Hubbard reservoirs to supply water for Dallas.

Mayor Thornton ran unopposed in 1955 and won ahead of two other candidates in 1957, despite a major tornado that ripped through Oak Cliff and West Dallas the afternoon of election day, April 2, 1957. By 1959, the 78-year-old Thornton would face his most formidable and last election. Opposed by Earle Cabell of Cabell's Dairy and the son and grandson of previous mayors of Dallas, Thornton was forced into a runoff since neither candidate received a majority of the votes. Two weeks later, Thornton won by 3,000 votes and began his fourth and last term as Mayor of Dallas. A National Geographic article by Stanley Walker noted in 1961 that his time in office had come to be regarded as the "Thornton era".

== Controversies ==
R. L. Thornton addressed controversial issues during his business, mayoral and civic life: severe water shortages, long-delayed civic projects, need for crime reduction, economic development challenges, and desegregation issues for the city and State Fair. The most difficult challenge was the fight for equal rights under the law for Black citizens during the 1950s and 1960s.

=== Integration and the State Fair ===
Black Americans served with distinction during World War II and returned home to seek racial change. A National Park Service document cited the NAACP: "emboldened by the record of Black servicemen in the war, a new corps of brilliant young lawyers ... initiated major attacks against discrimination and segregation". In Dallas, the leadership included A. Maceo Smith, Reverend E. C. Estell, Reverend Rhett James and Juanita Craft, the NAACP Youth Council advisor.

Since 1889 the State Fair in Dallas had been segregated and limited Black citizens' attendance to one day each year, initially called Colored People's Day, and later renamed Negro Achievement Day in 1936. Starting in 1953, Ms. Craft organized years of peaceful protests with her NAACP youth group and others until the Fair was fully desegregated in 1967. Over the years, Thornton, as Mayor and State Fair of Texas president, personally brokered agreements with Craft, other African American leaders, and opponents in the Anglo community.

In 1954, with the Supreme Court's decision in Brown v. Board of Education, the City of Dallas (and the Dallas Independent School District) needed to comply with the federal law regarding school and business desegregation and competing State of Texas decrees. Nearing the end of his last mayoral term, Thornton played a leadership role in Dallas' peaceful school and business desegregation and motivated the Dallas Citizens Council to mount a successful, peaceful Dallas desegregation effort. The political climate throughout Texas was significantly anti-integration, and Dallas remained one of the largest school systems in the South with a completely segregated school system.

Despite federal court decisions, the 55th Texas legislature passed a law in 1957 that required local communities to vote on school desegregation. Without a majority vote, Dallas ISD could lose $2.7 million in state aid, and lose accreditation if they tried to desegregate. The school superintendent and board members could be fined up to $1,000 for the same offense. In Dallas, a referendum was held on August 6, 1960 and resulted in an overwhelming 4 to 1 vote against integration.

Lacking a public mandate, "Mayor Thornton believed the situation to be so critical that the Dallas Citizens Council must exercise its power to assure success." Citing the loss of reputation and business in other Southern cities that had not successfully desegregated schools, he convinced the Citizens Council of the need to seek peaceful desegregation in schools and businesses for economic self-interest reasons. Acceding to the mayor's request, the Citizens Council agreed in 1960 to assume as a special project the successful integration of Dallas schools. The Council developed an extensive education campaign to facilitate the desegregation of Dallas schools by creating a climate to convince citizens of the need to accept desegregation peacefully.

Key steps included organizing a bi-racial Committee of 14 consisting of seven Black and seven white members to serve as a bridge between the two communities. The Black membership included George Allen, Juanita Craft, Rev. Ernest Estell, and William J. Durham while the white members were predominantly CEOs of Dallas' largest businesses.

The Citizens Council produced Dallas at the Crossroads, a film narrated by Walter Cronkite that was shown throughout the city more than 1,000 times to community groups with introductions by leading citizens; distributed more than 100,000 booklets through churches; and many companies included inserts in employee paychecks. On September 6, 1961 racial desegregation came quietly and peacefully in Dallas, as 18 Black children entered first-grade classes in eight historically white elementary schools.

President Kennedy praised Dallas' peaceful school integration and acclaimed the city's "responsible, level-headed leadership", which had led the way. Roy Wilkins, executive director of the national NAACP, asserted: "If this sort of thing had been done throughout the country – people willing to sit down together and talk about the problem – we would have a different picture now."

School desegregation progress followed a summer of peaceful business and city desegregation on a large scale without any public announcement. Lunch counters and hotels were successfully desegregated, "White-only" signs came down throughout the city, and at Fair Park open seating was initiated at the Dallas Summer Musicals and all carnival rides were opened to Black citizens. The peaceful Dallas school and business desegregation in 1961 was a stark contrast and nearly four years ahead of Gov. George Wallace's order to break up protests in Selma, Alabama which led to Bloody Sunday on the Edmund Pettus Bridge.

=== The Klan ===
Dallas in the 1920s had one of the highest proportions of Klan membership of any U.S. city, just at the time Thornton was rising to prominence. Up to one in three eligible (white, Protestant) men in Dallas are believed to have joined in the early 1920s. Confirmed Dallas Klansmen included the sheriff, district attorney, police chief, commissioner of railways, ministers of the church, with several prominent Dallas businessmen also numbered in the ranks of the Dallas klavern. In 1994, in his book Big D: Triumphs and Troubles of an American Supercity in the 20th Century, Darwin Payne wrote: "The president of Dallas County State Bank, Robert L. Thornton, [...] was a member [of the Ku Klux Klan]".

Following publication, Thornton's family said the accusation was false. "It was simply untrue", grandson Robert L. Thornton III wrote in a 1995 letter to the editor of the Dallas Morning News. He said that not once in R. L. Thornton's 83 years of life – including his thoroughly documented roles as a businessman, civic leader, and elected official – was there ever a single mention of a KKK membership. Moreover, for 30 years after his death in 1964, there was no public or known private suggestion or evidence that he was ever a member of the Ku Klux Klan (KKK).

According to the book's author, Payne himself, he had a sole source for ascribing KKK membership to Thornton. Payne cites it in a footnote in the revised, 2000 edition of Big D as "an undated document held by the Dallas Historical Society ... given by George B. Dealey in 1942". That document rested in the George B. Dealey archives at the Dallas Historical Society. It had been given to Dealey "by Mr. Albert Brin of ... Dallas" in 1942, about 20 years after the purported date of its creation.

The document was undated and unsigned, with no external verification. It was divided into three separate sections, two of which named 115 members of the Executive Committee and Steering Committee of the Klan at the time. There was a third section that listed about 270 businesses, labeled "Ku Klux Klan Business Firms 100%", under which the Dallas County State Bank was included, noting R. L. Thornton as president.There was no explanation as to what was meant by "business firms 100%". Dealey, however, in his transmittal letter to the Dallas Historical Society wrote that it was an "impossibility" that "the stores enumerated are said to be Ku Klux Klan 100%". The Klan itself noted: "We do not claim that every 100% American is a Klansman." In a letter to Dallas real estate executive Henry S. Miller Jr. after the publication of the 1994 edition, Payne acknowledged that Thornton was not listed on the individual member lists.

There are two investigations from the 1920s into Klan participation in Dallas on record. The first was published by the Dallas Dispatch newspaper on May 12, 1922. Dallas Dispatch reporters were stationed at Fair Park for a large Dallas regional Klan meeting. They recorded and vetted license plates of the attendees' automobiles. The second was the 1923 Klan Day at the State Fair. This was billed as "One of the Greatest Gatherings in Klan History" with 160,000 attendees. Support was documented in the Klan Day souvenir program and in a 25-page detailed financial audit prepared by the Klan auditor, J. F. Collier, and his auditing firm Bell, Collier, & Doyle. The firm's Special Examination report of June 13, 1924 listed receipts, vendors, advertisers and individuals who provided support in exhaustive detail. Neither R. L. Thornton nor Dallas County State Bank were named in either listing.

A possible source of confusion may be that a younger brother of R. L. Thornton was indeed a member and leader of the Ku Klux Klan in the 1920s. W. L. Thornton, a Dallas attorney and prominent judge, was active in both the Klan and the Democratic party locally, statewide, and nationally. Since the book's 1994 publication, some authors and journalists have perpetuated the accusation that Thornton was a "member of the Klan", by repeating Payne's assertion, without any apparent separate investigation or research of their own.

== Family and legacy ==
Statue of R. L. Thornton, Hall of State, Dallas, Texas

On June 1, 1905, Thornton married Mary Metta Stiles (April 13, 1887 – March 25, 1975) of Waxahachie. Dallas became their home; they raised a family and lived there for the rest of their lives. Together they had three daughters and a son: Katherine Marie, who married J. Frank Holt; Rosemary, who married Ralph Brinegar. One daughter, Mary Ann, died in 1924, aged 3.

Their son Robert L. Thornton Jr. (January 12, 1911 – September 24, 1992) was the founding chairman of the Dallas County Community College District (now Dallas College). He served on numerous boards including for Texas Woman's University and Dallas Baptist College and was a chairman of the United Negro College Fund. The R. L. Thornton Jr. Building in Dallas was named in his honor by Dallas College. He was named chairman of Mercantile Bank in 1969.

Their grandson, Robert L. Thornton III (born March 15, 1940), is a third-generation banker, having retired as vice chairman of JPMorgan Chase-Dallas. Thornton has been a trustee of The Nature Conservancy of Texas, a member of the University of Texas Press advisory board, a director of Southern Methodist University's Cox School of Business, and chairman and director emeritus of the Dallas Arboretum. He is an officer of the Dallas College (formerly Dallas County Community College District) Foundation.

Father, son, and grandson, were all three honored with the Linz Award, Dallas' most distinguished civic award.

=== Death ===
Mayor Thornton died at his home on February 15, 1964, aged 83. At his memorial service, Dr. William Dickinson, pastor of the Highland Park United Methodist Church, concluded: "His genius in leadership was seen not only in his limitless energy but in his ability to get other people to do things they did not know they could do. He not only built buildings and improved the appearance of a city, but more importantly, he helped men achieve their true stature."

== Notes ==
Political offices
Preceded by Jean Baptiste Adoue	Mayor of Dallas; 1953–1961	Succeeded by Earle Cabell
