= Charles Campbell =

Charles Campbell may refer to:

== Politicians ==
- Charles Campbell (member for Campbeltown), Scottish soldier and politician
- Charles Campbell (MP for Argyllshire) (c. 1695–1741), member of parliament for Argyllshire, 1736–1742
- Charles Campbell (New South Wales politician) (1810–1888), Australian politician
- Charles Campbell (Queensland politician) (1843–1919), member of the Queensland Legislative Council
- Charles James Campbell (1819–1906), Scottish-born merchant and political figure in Nova Scotia, Canada
- Charles Campbell (Hawaii politician) (1918–1986), American educator, civil rights activist and politician from Hawaii
- Charles Alexander Campbell (1855–1937), member of the Nova Scotia House of Assembly

== Sportspeople ==
- Charles Campbell (footballer) (1854–1927), Scottish footballer of the 1870s and 1880s
- Charles Campbell (British rower) (1805–1851), World Champion sculler
- Charles Campbell (Canadian rower) (1914–1963), Canadian Olympic rower
- Charles Campbell (sailor) (1881–1948), British Olympic gold medalist in 1908
- Charles H. Campbell (1858–1927), American football player, lawyer, and civic leader
- Charlie Campbell (Charles Campbell, born 1988), American soccer player
- Charlie Campbell (golfer) (c. 1890–?), Australian golfer

== Other people ==
- Charles Campbell, 2nd Baron Glenavy (1885–1963), aristocrat
- Charles Campbell, 9th Earl of Breadalbane and Holland (1889–1959), Scottish peer and soldier
- C. A. Campbell (Charles Arthur Campbell, 1897–1974), Scottish metaphysical philosopher
- Charles Augustus Rosenheimer Campbell (1863–1931), president of the San Antonio Academy of Medicine, proponent of bats for mosquito control
- Charles C. Campbell (general) (1948–2016), U.S. Army general and FORSCOM commander
- Charles C. Campbell (voice actor) (born 1968), Americqn voice actor
- Charles James Fox Campbell (1811–1859), early settler of Adelaide, South Australia
- Charles Gordon Campbell (1840–1905), Australian merchant and pastoralist
- Charles L. Campbell (1930–2013), American sound engineer
- Charles Macfie Campbell (1876–1943), American psychiatrist
- Charles Muir Campbell (1795–1874), initial subscriber to American Colonization Society
- Charles Rodman Campbell (1954–1994), executed convict
- Charles Sandwith Campbell (1858–1923), Canadian philanthropist and governor of McGill University
- Charles Thomas Campbell (1823–1895), American soldier, served as a Union Army general during the Civil War
- Charles Allieu Matthew Campbell (born 1961), Sierra Leonian Roman Catholic bishop
- Chuck Campbell (Charles Campbell, born 1969), Canadian comedian and actor
- Chuckie Campbell (Charles Edward Campbell, born 1981), American musician, poet, fiction writer, editor, publisher, and educator

== Other ==
- Charles Campbell College
