= Senator Campbell =

Senator Campbell may refer to:

== Members of the Northern Irish Senate ==
- Thomas Joseph Campbell (1871–1946), Northern Irish Senator from 1929 to 1934

== Members of the United States Senate ==
- Alexander Campbell (Ohio politician) (1779–1857), U.S. Senator from Ohio from 1809 to 1813
- Ben Nighthorse Campbell (born 1933), U.S. Senator from Colorado from 1993 to 2005
- George W. Campbell (1769–1848), U.S. Senator from Tennessee from 1815 to 1818

== United States state senate members ==
- Archibald Campbell (Wisconsin politician), Wisconsin State Senate
- Carroll A. Campbell Jr. (1940–2005), South Carolina State Senate
- Charles Campbell (Hawaii politician) (1918–1986), Hawaii State Senate
- David Campbell (Virginia politician) (1779–1859), Virginia State Senate
- Donna Campbell (born 1954), Texas State Senate
- Dwight Campbell (c. 1888–1964), South Dakota State Senate
- Ed H. Campbell (1882–1969), Iowa State Senate
- Foster Campbell (born 1947), Louisiana State Senate
- Francis Campbell (politician) (1829–1897), Wisconsin State Senate
- Frank T. Campbell (1836–1907), Ohio State Senate
- Harvey Campbell (politician) (1792–1877), Connecticut State Senate
- James R. Campbell (Illinois politician) (1853–1924), Illinois State Senate
- John B. T. Campbell III (born 1955), California State Senate
- John F. Campbell (politician) (born 1954), Vermont State Senate
- John Campbell (1765–1828), Maryland State Senate
- Joseph Campbell (politician) (fl. 1940s–1960s), Maine State Senate
- Kathy Campbell (born 1946), Nebraska State Senate
- Lewis D. Campbell (1811–1882), Ohio State Senate
- Paul G. Campbell Jr. (born 1946), South Carolina State Senate
- Peter J. Campbell (1857–1919), Maryland State Senate
- Robert B. Campbell (died 1862), South Carolina State Senate
- Samuel Campbell (New York state senator) (1809–1885), New York State Senate
- Skip Campbell (1948–2018), Florida State Senate
- Thomas F. Campbell (1897–1957), New York State Senate
- Timothy J. Campbell (1840–1904), New York State Senate
- Tom Campbell (California politician) (born 1952), California State Senate
- Tom Campbell (North Dakota politician) (born 1959), North Dakota State Senate
- Tunis Campbell (1812–1891), Georgia State Senate
- William J. Campbell (Illinois politician) (1850–1896), Pennsylvania State Senate
- William W. Campbell (New York state senator) (1870–1934), New York State Senate
- William Campbell (California politician) (1935–2015), California State Senate
