= Holland's Magazine =

Women's magazine published from 1876 to 1953

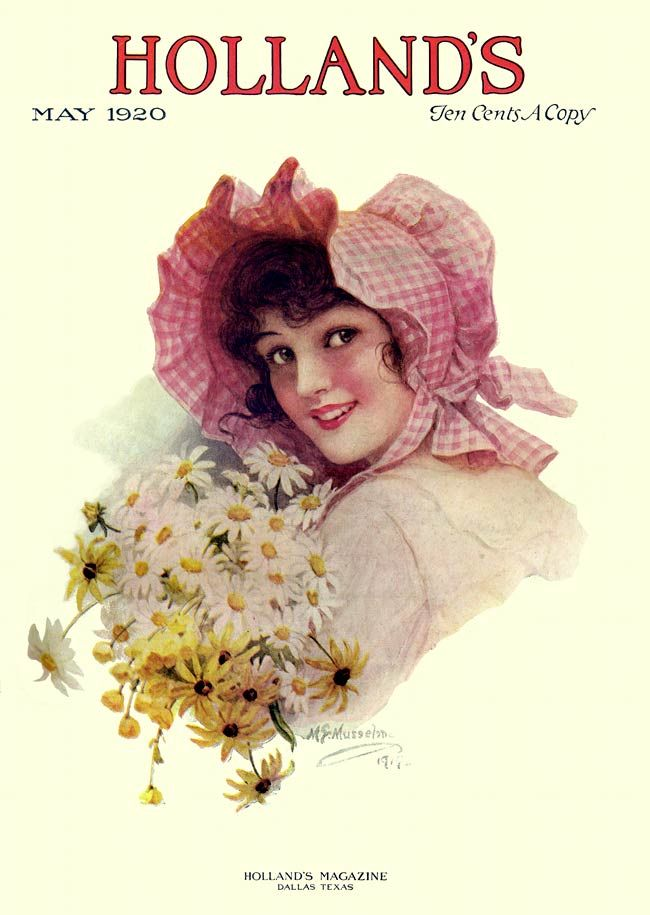
- May 1920 issue of Holland's Magazine
- Categories: Women's magazine
- Frequency: Monthly
- First issue: 1876
- Final issue: 1953
- Country: United States
- Based in: Dallas
- Language: English

Holland's Magazine (originally known as Street's Weekly, also known as Holland's: The Magazine of the South) was a magazine published from 1876 to 1953. It was a women's magazine that published recipes, fashion tips, gardening tips, sewing patterns, non-fiction, and short fiction. It was known for being a vehicle for social change and was influential in securing the passage of the Texas Pure Food law.

== Street's Weekly ==
From its founding in 1876 until its 23rd volume in 1905 the magazine was Street's Weekly and published weekly. Beginning with its 24th volume in 1905 it published monthly under a new name.

== Holland's Magazine ==
In 1905 F. P. Holland changed the name of Street's Weekly to Holland's Magazine and moved its headquarters to Dallas, Texas. Holland's became a monthly magazine, with page sizes measuring 15 by 11 inches (38 cm × 28 cm) and a full color cover. Roughly 40% of the magazine's contents were advertising. At ten cents an issue, it was more affordable than comparable magazines of the time.

The magazine campaigned for social change and improved living conditions. It campaigned for a pure food law in Texas in 1906, which the state legislature passed in 1907. In 1911 it supported the establishment of community recreation and social centers in small towns and rural communities. It sponsored "cleanest town" contests and contests for community development and "beautification". In 1924 Holland's campaigned for the protection of Texas wildlife and in 1925 a wildlife protection act was passed by the Texas legislature. In 1927 Charles Campbell wrote a series of articles and gave lectures on the use of natural predators to control mosquitos. By the end of the 1920s Holland's had the largest circulation of any magazine of its type in the south.

In 1926 the name of the magazine was changed to Holland's: The Magazine of the South.

The Holland family owned the magazine until 1952 when it was sold to Hugh Wolfe. Wolf sold the printing equipment to a Chicago publisher. Without the equipment the magazine was not able to mass-produce as many copies and there were fewer buyers. In December 1953 the last issue was published.

== Influence on pure food laws ==
F.P. Holland ran two magazines in Dallas in the early 1900s, Holland's and Texas Farm and Ranch, which was about farming products and practices.

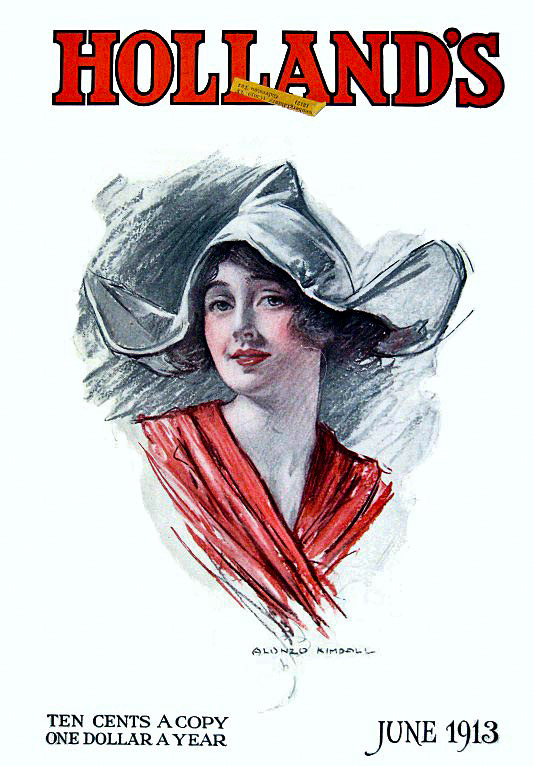
Cover by Alonzo Myron Kimball, 1913

Although women in the first decade of the 1900s were not yet entitled to vote, they cared deeply about the quality of food available to feed their families, and were strong supporters of the federal Pure Food and Drug Act. More and more people were living in cities and were no longer growing and preparing their own food. Whereas their mothers had probably harvested eggs from their own chickens, churned their own butter, and made their own jam many women in the early 1900s were buying these products already made, and had no idea if the eggs were fresh or had been sitting in storage for weeks, if the butter was fresh or if rancid butter had been mixed with new, and what was in the jam. Upton Sinclair's The Jungle, combined with the work of journalists to expose abuses, and advocacy by women's groups made advocating for pure food laws a priority for many women. When the federal Pure Food and Drug Act was passed in 1906 there was a need for states to take reciprocal action. Texas had a law forbidding adulterated animal feed, but no such law for humans.

Women's groups in Texas began pushing for a state pure food law. As a publication geared towards women with a sister publication geared towards agriculture, Holland's was well-positioned to aid in this endeavor. Beginning in August and September 1906 Holland's ran a series of muckraking articles documenting formaldehyde in milk, poisoned meat, and the like, which laid the groundwork for a 1907 bill. The bill also had the support of the medical community, which praised Holland's work highly. The Texas Medical Journal said,

In September Holland's will take up the subject of milk. The people of Texas, or at least those in the larger cities and towns, are being forced to buy a very large amount of milk which is treated with formaldehyde and other preservatives. Milk adulteration is one of the greatest crimes which can be committed against the public since the life and health of thousands of helpless children in the larger cities and towns are absolutely dependent upon the milk supply.

During this time Holland's in conjunction with their sister publication Farm and Ranch conducted a study where they purchased food items at various markets throughout the south and southwest and hired a chemist to test them. The results they gathered were described as "alarming" and prompted the North Texas Medical Association to adopt a resolution endorsing the work of the magazines and campaign for pure food and drug laws at the state level.

Holland's regularly published work by female authors like Mary Work and Helen Stoddard, who were active in designing the bill and getting it passed. It published legislative petitions for readers to circulate and send to their representatives.
