= Chuckie Campbell =

American rapper (born 1981)

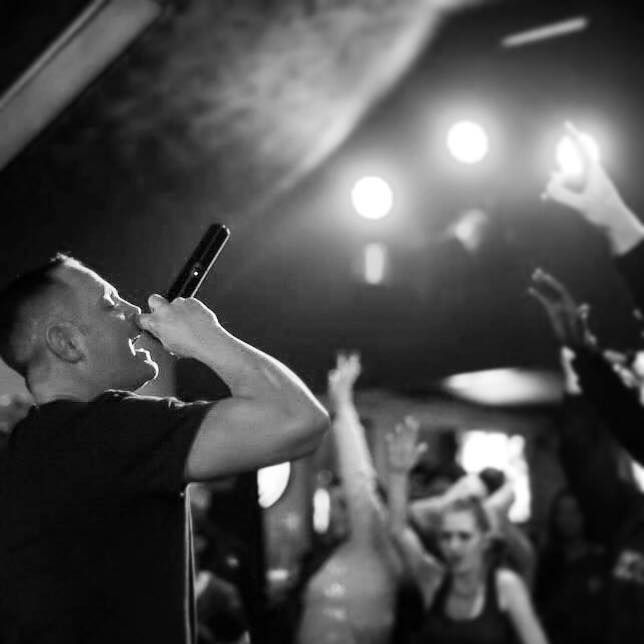

Background information
- Born: Charles Edward Campbell; January 23, 1981 (age 45)
- Origin: Buffalo, New York
- Genres: Hip hop
- Occupations: Rapper, songwriter, musician, producer, fiction writer, poet, publisher, educator
- Years active: 1998-2004; 2011–present
- Label: Deep Thinka Records
- Website: chuckiecampbellmusic.com

Charles Edward "Chuckie" Campbell (born January 23, 1981) is an American musician, writer, poet, editor, publisher, and educator. His hip-hop work has won him two All WNY Music Awards (2014) and two Best of Buffalo Best Hip Hop Act awards from Artvoice (2016). He tours under Deep Thinka Records out of Buffalo, New York. As of 2019, Campbell has also taught English and Communications at Bryant & Stratton College for eight years.

== Early life and education ==
Chuckie Campbell was raised in Richmond, Kentucky, attending Madison Central High School. His time on the basketball team earned him a college scholarship to Lee University, where he played four years of college basketball. Campbell graduated in 2003 with his B.A. in communications and a minor in religious studies. In 2004, Campbell began working toward an M.A. in English and Creative Writing at Eastern Kentucky University. He graduated in 2007 and started on his PhD the following year at University of Southern Mississippi. Among his professors were Frederick and Steven Barthelme.

== Career ==
Esente Center Stage selected Campbell as their emerging artist of the week in 2011. In early 2013, his song, "The Streets," produced by Marc Jones, garnered 95,058 amps, listens and shares in the Grammy's Amplifier Contest, the most in any genre category. The song was later disqualified from the contest for improper interpolations. He released his first full-length album, More Die of Heartbreak, later that year. It was produced by Willie Breeding and featured guest appearances from Cappadonna, Solomon Childs and Block McCloud, among others. The album art and a lyric booklet DVD case insert were illustrated by Kerby Rosanes. It garnered positive reviews from Under the Gun, AbsolutePunk, The Huffington Post, and BK United.

In September 2014, Campbell won two All WNY Music Awards, one for Best New Artist (all genres) and the other for Best Rapper/Hip Hop Performer. In December 2014, Campbell signed a booking deal with Deep Thinka Records out of Buffalo, New York. In 2016, Campbell won Best of Buffalo Awards for Best Hip Hop Artist and Best Original Music. His second album, Taking Back Tomorrow, was released in 2018 and features Ras Kass, Talib Kweli, Quadir Lateef, Heidi Feek, Nicole Atkins, Iesha Green, and Mad Dukez, among others. It garnered positive reviews from Ellenwood-EP, Most Addictive Music, The Word is Bond, and Empty Lighthouse Magazine. Layla Klamt of Guardian Liberty Voice praised Campbell for "tell[ing] the story of the new hip hop, which has room for all races, creeds, and even genres of music" and for "fus[ing] classical music, country and pop."

Campbell founded the short-lived literary magazine Sunsets and Silencers. He moved to Buffalo in 2011 to teach English and Communication courses at Bryant & Stratton College. In 2015, he gave a TEDx Youth Buffalo talk titled "Bond or Barrier: Language and Social Identity," which addressed language and its ability to frame social realities. In 2017, he started the Taking Back Tomorrow Scholarship, awarding a $1,500 annual scholarship to one Madison Central High School student, a college-bound high school senior, based on the demonstrated ability to overcome a life obstacle in pursuit of their higher education.

== Personal life ==
In the summer of 2004, Campbell was assaulted by his friend and music mentor Ralph B. Prater, requiring him to have facial reconstruction surgery. He did not make or perform music again for almost 7 years after the incident. More Die of Heartbreak is dedicated to Prater, who died by suicide in March 2011.

== Honors and awards ==
Music

- Esente Center Stage Emerging Artist of the Week, 2012
- All WNY Music Award for Best New Artist, 2014
- All WNY Music Award for Best Rap/Hip Hop Performer, 2014
- Album of the Week, 2014, Hiplanta
- Canalside Battle of the Bands Winner: Hip Hop, 2015
- Best of Buffalo Best Hip Hop Act, 2016, Artvoice
- Best of Buffalo Best Original Music, 2016, Artvoice
- "THIS IS MY YEAR" Winner, 2018, A3C Music Festival

Other

- Fiction Award, 2007, Eastern Kentucky University
- Julia Visor Award, 2008, National College Learning Center Association
- Madonna Marsden Fiction Award, 2007
- Julia Visor Award, 2010, National College Learning Center Association
- McNair Scholars Program Grant, 2011, US Department of Education
- Distinguished Faculty Award, 2012, Bryant & Stratton College
- Distinguished Faculty Award, 2017, Bryant & Stratton College
