= Winship C. Connor =

American mayor (1848–1921)

Winship Capers Connor

22nd Mayor of Dallas
- In office 1887–1894
- Preceded by: John Henry Brown
- Succeeded by: Bryan T. Barry

Personal details
- Born: June 22, 1848 Red Sulphur Springs, Hardin County, Tennessee
- Died: April 8, 1921 (aged 72) Long Beach, California
- Resting place: Oakland Cemetery, Dallas
- Spouse(s): Tullora Fannie Cornelius, Ada Cheatham Rye
- Children: Anna F. Connor, Walker Cornelius Connor, Edward Cowen Connor
- Occupation: Merchant

Winship Capers Connor (Jun 1848 – August 4, 1921), businessman, was mayor of Dallas from 1887 to 1894, serving four terms. He built the first light, water and streetcars systems in Dallas.

== Biography ==
Winship Capers Connor was born June 22, 1848, in Red Sulfur Springs, Hardin County, Tennessee, to William J. Connor and Julia Catherin Hymes. He married Tullora Fannie Cornelius, daughter of Dr. Matthias A. Cornelius and Elizabeth A. Lewis, in Louisiana. She died in 1878. They had two children: Anna F. Connor and Walker Cornelius Connor. In 1879, he married Ada Cheatham Rye, daughter of Joseph Clark Rye and Martha Cheatham, in Tennessee. They had one son, Edward Cowen Connor.

He moved with parents and siblings from Tennessee to Corinth, Mississippi, around 1853. After his father's death, the family moved Madison County, Arkansas; Paris, Texas; and Jefferson, Texas. He and his brother Lewis moved to Arizona, Claiborne Parish, Louisiana, in 1869 where he worked as a merchant.

Coming to Dallas around 1870, Winship Connor opened a drug store. The Dallas Morning News detailed his many works as a private citizen. He was recognized for erecting the first brick building in Dallas; as the first manufacturer of chewing gum in the state; for organizing the first fire department, first waterworks and first electric companies in Dallas; for building the first ice house, the first street railway line; and for building water plants in other Texas cities.

In 1878 he was vice president, First National Bank; owner of Connor and Walker Wholesale Druggists; President, Commerce and Ervay Street Railway Company; and board member, Lawrence's Commercial College. He built a streetcar line using mule cars. The line ran up Main Street out Ervay to Browder Springs, the current location of Dallas Heritage Village at Old City Park. Later when the electric street car line was established, he became vice president of Dallas Consolidated Street Railway. In 1880 he was Chief, Dallas Fire Department; Secretary, Dallas City Gas Light Company; President, Dallas Water Supply Company; President, Main and Ervay Street Railway Company. In 1884 he was president, Dallas Electric Light Company; vice-president, Dallas Belt Street Railway Company.

In 1887, William Connor was elected mayor of Dallas. He was elected to four terms as mayor, losing a fifth term to Bryan T. Barry by two votes. During his terms in office, he also served as president, Dallas Board of Trade (1888), president, Merchants State Bank (1888–1889, and president, State Fair of Texas (1891). After leaving public office, he still took an interest in the city.

He died at the Virginia Hotel, Long Beach, Los Angeles County, California, while on his way to Hawaii. He was interred at the Oakland Cemetery in Dallas, Texas.
