= Edwin Le Roy Antony =

American politician (1852–1913)

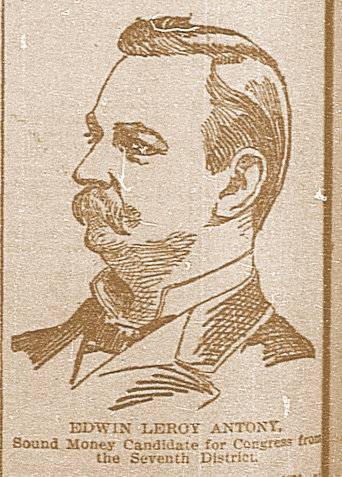
Edwin Le Roy Antony (January 5, 1852 – January 16, 1913), U.S. politician

Edwin Le Roy Antony (January 5, 1852 – January 16, 1913) served in the U.S. House of Representatives from the State of Texas from June 14, 1892 to March 4, 1893, following the resignation of Roger Mills. Antony attended the University of Georgia where he was a member of the Phi Kappa Literary Society and the Fraternity of Phi Gamma Delta. Antony had previously been prosecuting attorney of Milam County and a district judge. Edwin Le Roy Antony died in Dallas, Texas, and was buried in Oakland Cemetery.

U.S. House of Representatives
Preceded by Roger Q. Mills	Member of the U.S. House of Representatives from Texas's 9th congressional district June 14, 1892 - March 3, 1893	Succeeded by Joseph D. Sayers
