= Bryan T. Barry =

American politician

Bryan Thomas Barry

23rd, 25th and 28th Mayor of Dallas
- In office 1894–1895
- Preceded by: Winship C. Connor
- Succeeded by: F. P. Holland

Personal details
- Born: October 26, 1851 near Dresden, Navarro County, Texas
- Died: March 5, 1919 (aged 67) Dallas, Texas
- Resting place: Grove Hill Cemetery, Dallas
- Spouse(s): Odora Elizabeth Williams, Ellen Sophie Hermany Stone
- Children: Charles S. Barry, Lela Barry
- Occupation: Attorney

Bryan Thomas Barry (October 26, 1851 – March 5, 1919), attorney, was mayor of Dallas for three terms: 1894–1895, 1897–1898 and 1904–1907.

== Biography ==
Bryan T. Barry was born October 26, 1851, near Dresden, Navarro County, Texas, to Augustus Barry and Margaret Eleanor Younger. He married Odora Elizabeth Williams, daughter of Thomas M. and A. Elizabeth Williams, on May 1, 1874, in Robertson County, Texas. They had two children Charles T. Barry and Lela Barry. After her death in 1914, he married Ellen Sophie Hermany Stone, daughter of Charles W. Hermany and Caroline Levy, and widow of Aubrey Stone.

Prior to moving to Dallas, Barry lived in Navarro and Robertson counties. He was the original land owner of 300 acres that became the community of Barry, Texas. He was admitted to the bar in Houston, Texas in 1872 and practiced law in Corsicana.

Bryan Barry moved to Dallas around 1889 where he became involved in banking, investments and law. He headed the law firm of Barry & Etheridge, was Secretary/Treasurer for Texas Savings and Trust

In 1893, W. C. Connor won the election for mayor by 2 votes over Bryan T. Barry. Barry brought suit contending that there were questions about some of the votes, but Connor was seated by the city council. Connor resigned as mayor in January 1894 and the city council decided to hold a special election. However, the state supreme court ruled on the appeal of the previous case and declared Barry to be the mayor, after which the city council decided to seat Barry as mayor. He was re-elected mayor in 1894 and was replaced by Franklin P. Holland in the 1895 election. He was elected again in 1897, serving one year and being replaced by John H. Traylor. In 1904, he was once more elected mayor and served until 1906, when Curtis P. Smith was elected.

Barry died March 5, 1919, in Dallas, Texas, and was interred at Oakland Cemetery in Dallas. He and his first wife, Odora Williams Barry, were re-interred at Grove Hill Cemetery, Dallas, in December 1934.
