= Franklin Pierce Holland =

American journalist

24th Mayor of Dallas
- In office 1895–1897
- Preceded by: Bryan T. Barry
- Succeeded by: Bryan T. Barry

Personal details
- Born: September 22, 1852 Galveston, Texas
- Died: January 18, 1928 (aged 75) Dallas, Texas
- Resting place: Oakland Cemetery, Dallas
- Spouse: Pamelia Allen
- Children: Franklin P. Holland, Jr., Reginald Vincent Holland, Ira Holland, Augusta Holland, J. Porter Holland, Marsh W. Holland
- Occupation: Publishing

Franklin Pierce Holland (September 22, 1852 – January 18, 1928), was a publisher and the mayor of Dallas in 1895–1897.

== Early life ==
Franklin Pierce Holland was born on September 22, 1852, in Galveston, Texas. His parents were Dr. Gustavus Holland, a native of Stuttgart, Wurtemberg, Germany and Evelyn Compton of Louisiana.

Following his schooling at Redding, Fairfield County, Connecticut, Holland returned to Texas and found work as a sewing machine and farm implement salesman in Austin, Texas. He began working for Texas Siftings as an editor. Later, he started Texas Farm and Ranch Magazine and served as its editor and publisher. He was involved in the establishment Dallas State Fair (forerunner to the State Fair of Texas), serving as the first general manager of the fair.

== Mayor of Dallas ==
Franklin P. Holland was elected alderman in 1891. He was elected mayor of Dallas on April 2, 1895, beating Bryan T. Barry, Frank Wozencraft, and John B. Louckx. In 1905, he began publishing Holland's Magazine.

== Personal life ==
He married Pamelia Allen, daughter of Joseph D. Allen and Pamelia Roberts on 25 Dec 1877, in Waxahachie, Ellis County, Texas. They had six children: Franklin P. Holland Jr., Reginald Vincent Holland, Ira Holland, Augusta Holland, J. Porter Holland, and Marsh W. Holland.

== Death ==
F. P. Holland died January 18, 1928, in Dallas, Texas and was interred at the Oakland Cemetery in Dallas, Texas.
