= Oakland Cemetery (Dallas, Texas) =

American cemetery

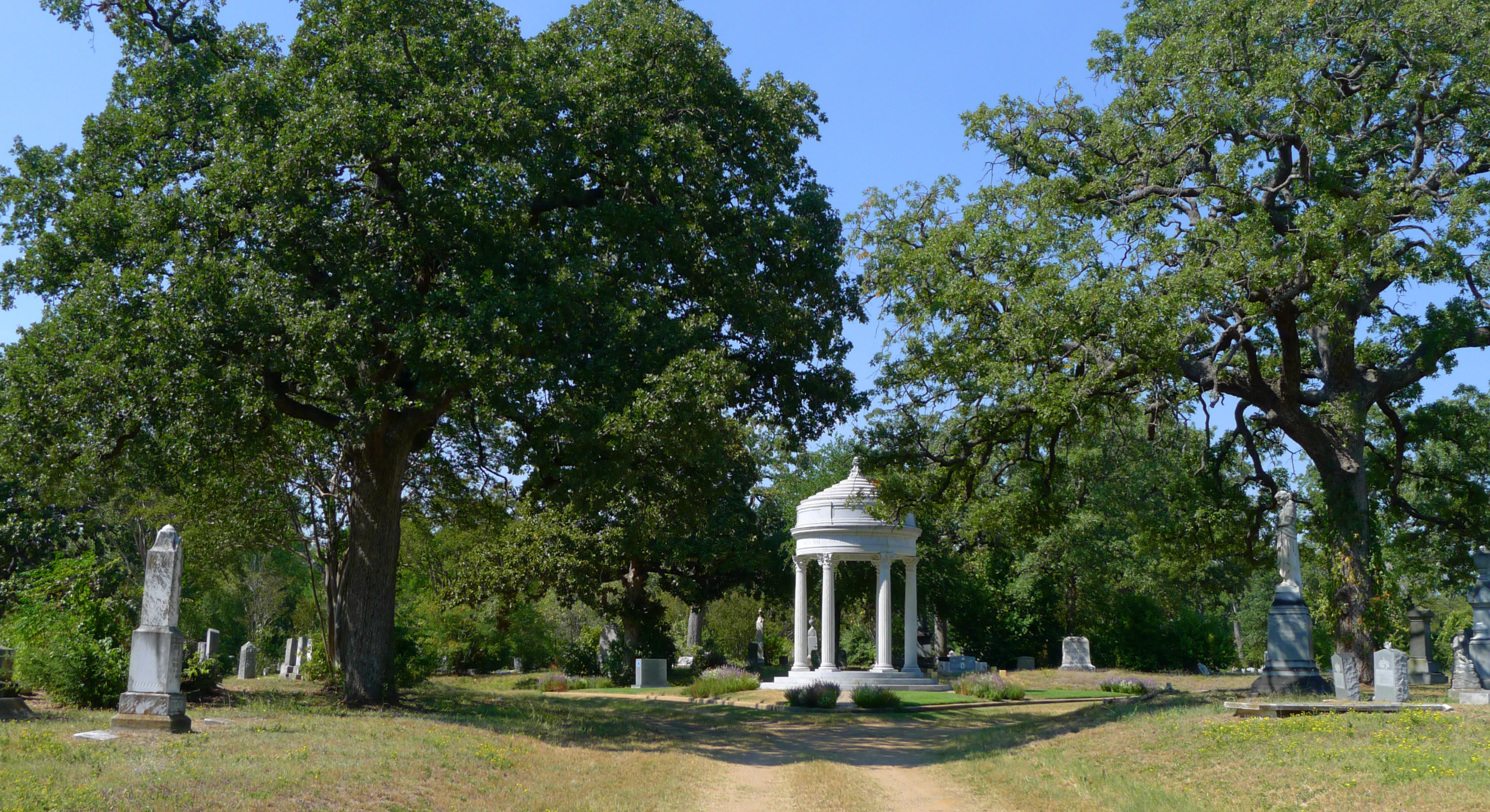
- Oakland Cemetery in 2014
- Interactive map of Oakland Cemetery

Details
- Established: 1892
- Location: Dallas, Texas
- Country: United States
- Coordinates: 32.7625°N 96.7574°W
- Type: Public, non-denominational
- Owned by: Oakland Cemetery Lot Owners Association
- Website: oaklandcemeterydallas.com
- Find a Grave: Oakland Cemetery

The Oakland Cemetery is a historic cemetery in Dallas, Texas, United States. It originally stood on 180 acres in rural Dallas County 1.5 miles southeast of the county court house when it opened in 1892. Economic problems, court judgements, land sales and acquisitions altered the cemetery to approximately 48 acres by 1969. About 27,000 people have selected Oakland Cemetery as the burial location for themselves and/or their family members. Burials include many prominent politicians, educators, physicians, ministers, business leaders, military service members, ancestors of famous individuals and ordinary citizens. The cemetery has a number of interesting memorials, sculptures and vaults. Mount Auburn pauper cemetery, owned by the city of Dallas, a Dallas county pauper cemetery (Rest Haven), and Opportunity Park, a city of Dallas public park border Oakland Cemetery. A Confederate cemetery, cared for by the city of Dallas Parks Department, is nearby.

== History ==
The Oakland Cemetery was built on land which Thomas Lagow was awarded for emigrating to Texas before March 2, 1836. He received a First-Class Headright of a league and labor (4,605.50 acres) from Republic of Texas in 1841. After his death in 1844, 1,000 acres were deeded to Lagow's father-in-law, Armstead Bennett (1785–1859). Bennett's son-in-law and daughter, Daniel and Judith (Bennett) Parker, sold 680 acres to Nathaniel C. Floyd (1796–1870) in 1854. Floyd divided the land into 19 blocks which his probate distributed to his wife and three daughters. The land as covered with trees which Floyd used to describe in the division of the land: post oak, blackjack oak, Spanish oak, American elm, mulberry, ash, pecan, hackberry, burr oak, and honey locust trees.

Oliver Perry Bowser and William Henry Lemmon, real estate brokers, purchased over 232 acres from N. C. Floyd's daughters in 1888. O. S. Riggen purchased 30 acres that comprise NW 1/2 of Block 4 of the Floyd estate from Bowser and Lemmon with the idea of establishing a cemetery outside the city limits. The Rules and Regulations of the Oakland Cemetery Company, published in 1892, credits Riggen with beginning the effort to establish a rural, garden cemetery in Dallas County. His death in 1891 caused his 30 acres to be sold to Joseph Weil. Others followed adding 120 more acres to the project. The final acquisition consisted of Blocks 1, 3, and 4, each approximately 567.5 square varas (about 60 acres) in an L shape.

=== Oakland Cemetery Company ===
On 6 June 1891, the Texas Secretary of State approved the incorporation of Oakland Cemetery Company. James. C. O’Connor, John S. Armstrong, B. Blankenship, Thomas J. Oliver, James Moroney, William H. Lewis, William N. Coe, and John P. Murphy were directors of the company. On 24 September 1892, they elected J. P. Murphy, President; T. J. Oliver, Vice President; and C. B. Gillespie, Secretary/Treasurer. In August 1892, William H. Lewis, Zachariah E. Coombes & William B. Gano, Joseph Weil and William N. Coe sold The Oakland Cemetery Company a total of 180 acres of the N. C. Floyd Estate that they acquired through various transactions with O.P. Bowser, W. H. Lemmon and others.

The Oakland Cemetery Company Board dedicated the 180 acres for the purpose of a cemetery. The company hired J. B. Buchanan as superintendent and landscape gardener. Benjamin Grove, a cemetery engineer, from Louisville, Kentucky, produced a design in the style of a rural, garden cemetery similar to Mount Auburn Cemetery near Boston. The land that the cemetery company acquired was L-shaped, consisting of Blocks 1, 3 and 4 of the Floyd estate. "The spot was covered with a thick growth of trees." While old oak trees were kept, landscape gardeners added rose bushes and graveled pathways to the land. Groves submitted a plan for a total of 120 acres of the 180 acres which then became the official plat of the cemetery which the cemetery association filed with the county.

The Oakland Cemetery Company, in an 1899 lot owners meeting, said that "the grounds shall be limited exclusively to the purchasers respectively of lots therein; and that 25 per cent of the sum received in the sale of each and every lot in all time to come shall be, and is hereby set apart and made a perpetual fund, to be loaned upon the best securities by three trustees, one to be selected by the company and two by the lot-owners: and the interest received there form devoted to the care and keeping of the grounds, graves, etc.."

=== "Can't Mortgage Cemeteries" – finances and court cases ===
Several court cases arose when the Oakland Cemetery Company borrowed from various banks and individuals in the 1890s. American National Bank and others sued the company and its officers for failure to pay debts. The district court charged the county sheriff or constable to sell cemetery property. The county sheriff sold 30 acres each to E. O. Tenison and Guy Sumpter who six months later conveyed the property to the newly formed People's Cemetery Association. Both the Oakland Cemetery Company and the People's Cemetery Association sold burial lots in the cemetery. The Oakland Cemetery Company appealed. The case was eventually brought to the Texas Supreme Court which ruled that land dedicated for a cemetery could not be sold to resolve a debt. The Dallas Morning News summed up the results with the headline “Can't Mortgage Cemeteries.”

=== Land sales, acquisitions, change in ownership ===
Burials only occurred in Floyd's Block 1. Oakland Cemetery Company sold various parcels from Block 3 and 4. Later, the company purchased additional land on the northwest side of the cemetery. In 1926, the Oakland Cemetery Company was dissolved and replaced by the Oakland Lot Owners Association. Of the land originally acquired from the Nathaniel C. Floyd estate, only Block 1 remained in the cemetery. Oakland Cemetery Company sold the 55.28 acres of the cemetery to Oakland Cemetery Lot Owners Association. A trust fund for maintenance costs was established.

Oakland Cemetery Lot Owners sold 9.125 acres on the southeast line to the City of Dallas for Opportunity Park in 1969.The deed stated that "there have been no burials in this portion of the cemetery and that no lots or burial rights were every conveyed out of Oakland Cemetery Lot Owners' Association, Incorporated, to any person, in this section of the cemetery." The land was part of the NE 1/2 of the SE 1/2 part of Block 1 of the Floyd estate.

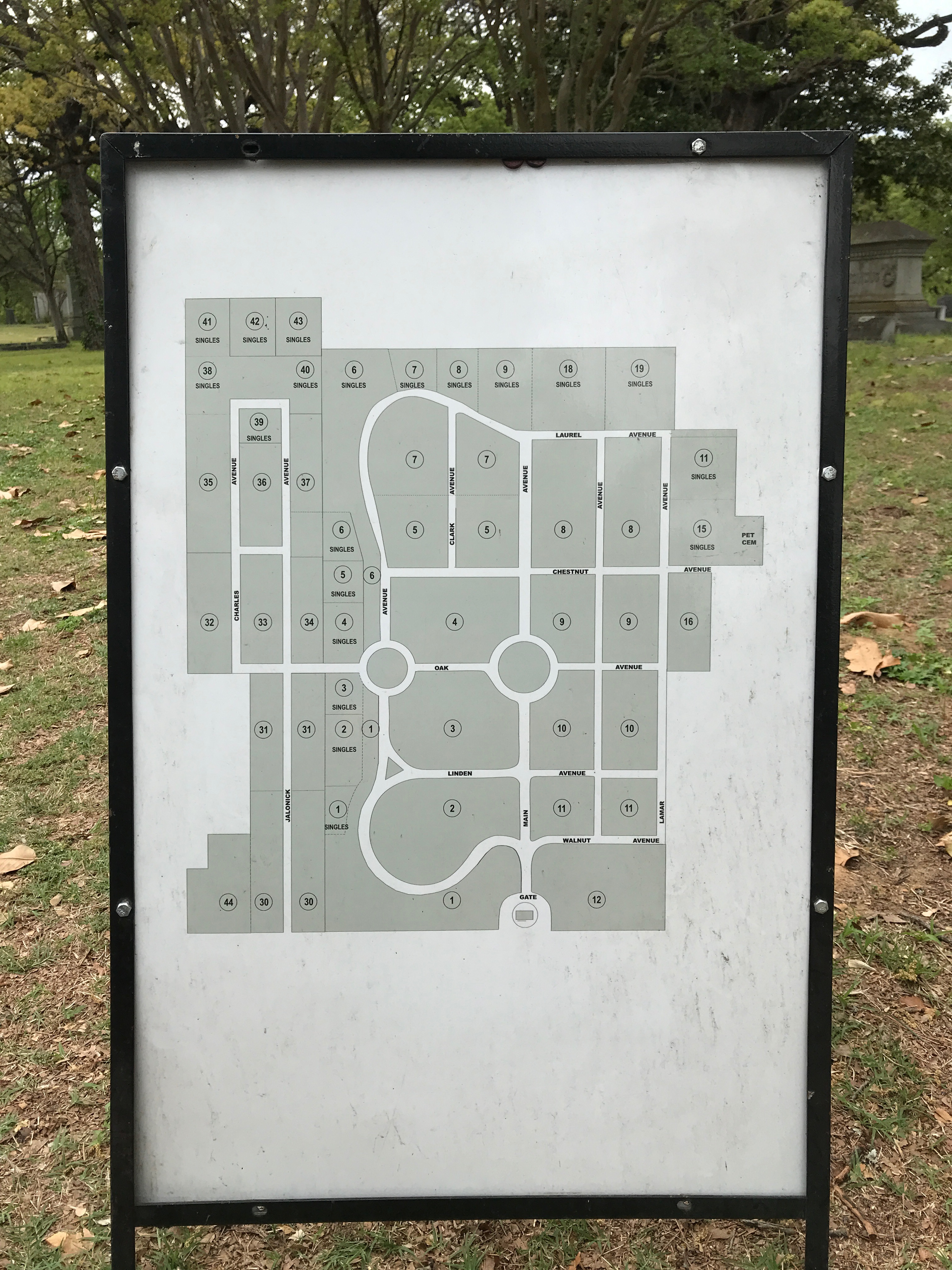
Oakland Cemetery Map

=== Cemetery sections ===
The cemetery is laid out in sections containing lots and sections containing tiers (rows). Besides family plots and individual graves, Oakland Cemetery Company rules and regulations stated that it would "supply ample grounds for societies and religious denominations; and when such organization have chosen a part of the cemetery, it would be well for them to select an appropriate name for it." Three sections exist today: Elks Rest, (Benevolent and Protective Order of Elks), Woodmen of the World, and Texas Graduate Nurses Association. The Texas Graduate Nurses Association sold much of their section to Oakland Cemetery Lot Owners in 1997.

There are markers for Masons, Shriners, Knights Templar, Order of Eastern Star, Knights of Pythias, Fraternal Order of Eagles, Independent Order of Odd Fellows, and International Association of Rebecca Assemblies, Woodmen of the World and Sons of Hermann. through the cemetery. There are a few Daughters of the American Revolution, Sons of the American Revolution, United Confederate Veterans and Grand Army of the Republic symbols on markers in the cemetery.

Dallas County Deed Book 172 was created especially to record the sale of lots. The first recorded sale was to John Milton McCoy. He purchased all of Lot 1, Section 2 (845 square feet). The first burial was that of John M.'s wife, Mrs May Alice Peel McCoy, in 1892. In June 1893 he had six members of his family removed from Masonic Cemetery in Dallas and reinterred in Oakland Cemetery. These were his uncle, John Calvin McCoy, Cora McDermett McCoy, wife of John C., Eliza McCoy, Cora McCoy Grimes, and J. C. Taggart. Odd S Riggen, the man credited with the first purchase of land on which to Oakland Cemetery was built, died before it opened. He and his wife, who predeceased him, were initially interred in Greenwood Cemetery. They were removed to Oakland Cemetery in May 1893.

There is a pet section in the Oakland cemetery. A rumor says that a horse and a monkey are buried there. No records support this. The pets buried there do not have interment cards. One dog is buried next to Nellie Wood Kiest in Oakland Section 1. The curious thing is that the dog's interment is listed as 1965 on the lot owner's card.

=== Cemetery management ===
J. B. Buchanan was the first Oakland Cemetery superintendent. A. S. Hall was superintendent in 1896. George W. Loudermilk (1870–1948) became cemetery superintendent in 1902 and continued through 1920. While managing his responsibilities at Oakland Cemetery, he continued in the undertaking business and served as superintendent at Greenwood Cemetery in Dallas. Although there is a striking Loudermilk monument, he is not buried in Oakland. Others who followed Loudermilk include M. H. Duncan (1924), H. C. Early (1925), J. A. Centerwell (1930), J. L. Osborne (1937), Joe J. Chambers (1940). During Loudermilk's time at Oakland and later, C. H. Brantley was the sexton. Captain L. Fulps was the supervisor and landscape gardener in the 1920s and 1930s.

=== Oakland through the years ===
==== 1900s through 1920s ====
According to a 1915 map by Koch & Fowler Engineers, Oakland Cemetery was still outside of the city of Dallas. The city held an annexation election in 1919 and added 5.75 square miles to the city of Dallas. Oakland Cemetery was part of that annexed area.

Tombstone marks the 1900 Galveston hurricane.

A 1916 arson of the George W. Loudermilk office at Oakland cemetery destroyed many records. Subsequent superintendents and sextons recreated interment cards and made lists of burials from books that escaped the fire. In 1946, the records of Oakland Cemetery was again the target of fire after the files were rifled. It did not result in much damage.

Burials in sections 18 and 19 attest to the devastation of the meningitis outbreak (1911–1912) and the 1918 flu pandemic. Death certificates identify those who died of these two illnesses. These single sections seem to have burials in chronological order in those time periods. There are few tombstones in these sections.

The 1922 Sanborn Map 491 shows the cemetery and surrounding area including Sarvers Floral and cemetery buildings. Spencer street on the southeast is now Pine Street. October 12, 1923, p. 13

"Plan Discussed to Beautify Cemetery," Dallas Morning News, May 2, 1924, p. 13.

In 1924 W. H. Wray was elected cemetery association president and Oakland Cemetery Association applied for and received a new charter. In 1925 Wray resigned and George W. Jalonick became president of the association.

===== Oakland Cemetery Lot Owners' Association =====
Oakland Cemetery Lot Owners' Association incorporated on December 1, 1924. Oakland Cemetery Company dissolved December 31, 1925. In January 1926 Oakland Cemetery Lot Owner's Association announced in the Dallas Morning News that they had "purchased from the old cemetery company" all the unplatted acreage and unsold lots for $48,750. This included about one hundred and fifty 20x30 lots and 600 single grave lots. Part of the improvements involved connecting Oakland to the city water system and adding three-inch and four-inch water lines to insure water for the entire cemetery during the summer. "Oakland Cemetery to Be Improved, Owners' Association Announce," – Dallas Morning News, March 2, 1926, p. 14.

"Louisiana Plan Adopted by Lagow District Owners in Effort to Get Segregation," Dallas Morning News. October 26, 1926, p. 13

"Answer South Dallas Protest. Negro School to be in Center of Wheatley Addition," Dallas Morning News, January 1, 1929, p. 13

"Negro High School Proposal Opposed By South League," Dallas Morning News, January 10, 1929, p. 13

"Guards Placed Over Graves," Dallas Morning News, August 30, 1929 p. 13 – Molesting graves Josepha Soerbel

==== 1930s through 1950s ====
"Cemetery Safes Opened by Yeggs But Found Empty, Dallas Morning News, Jan 12, 1931, p. 9. [Yeggs = burglar or safecracker]

"Pair Held After Disappearance Week Ago of Curly Woodruff; Warned, His Wife Moves Away" Dallas Morning News, February 8, 1931 ["the body of a man was hastily loaded into a car and carried away by two men who fled from the pauper section of Oakland Cemetery ..."

"Oakland Cemetery To Be Beautified With Landscaping. Nonmonument Section to be Added to South Dallas Park." Dallas Morning News, June 24, 1931, p.

"More Improvements Planned at Cemetery," Dallas Morning News, July 3, 1931 ["new memorial lawn of the cemetery is to have walks laid out and built in and is to be landscaped. Into this will come new property acquired by the association. 'In this memorial lawn all interments will be under the nonmonument plan, Mr. Byalock said.' "]

"Wife's Body Thrown in Grave Without Casket, Man Claims: Dallas Morning News, November 19, 1931, p. 1

"Memorial Day Observed for Person Aiding in Making World Better," May 31, 1933 [includes mention o Mrs. Emma H. Grauwyler who gave land for Dallas parks.

"Oakland Lot Owners to Build Upkeep Fund," Dallas Morning News, December 15, 1933, p. 11.

"Cemetery Society May Ask Federal Improvement Cash, Dallas Morning News, December 23, 1933, p.

The Daughters of 1812 organization honored Lucy Jeanette Power Cary (1842–1924), wife of Joseph Milton Cary, with a marker as a "Real Daughter of 1812" in 1932. Her father fought in the War of 1812. She is the mother of Dr. Edward H. Cary.

The Dallas Morning News reported that a Dallas citizen saw and spoke to Clyde Barrow who was parked in Oakland Cemetery with Raymond Hamilton and two women in the early evening of April 6, 1934.

Granite tombstone stolen from Oakland in 1934

An Abilene, Texas newspaper reported that 28 tombs at Oakland were vandalized in 1937. The Dallas criminal court judge sentenced an Oakland Cemetery Lot Owner Association officer to five years for each of five cases in 1938 for embezzling cemetery funds.

"Five-Year Terms Given Oakland Cemetery Man," Dallas Morning News February 11, 1938, p. 5

"Tacit Threats Made in Negro Home Dispute," Dallas Morning News, September 30, 1939 [Discussion on Racial Segregation]

"Move to black Negro Church Erection Set," Dallas Morning News, December 30, 1939.

The Oakland Cemetery Lot Owners Association built an office for the cemetery in the front drive of the cemetery in 1952. Roger L. Tennant, an association director, told the Dallas Morning News that the funds for the building came from voluntary subscription. Other directors were Joseph Agee, Ben Y. Cammack, Henry Exall, Stephen J. Hay, B. Manning, Miss Roberta Reeves, and Judge Town Young.

Fund Drive Launched for Old Cemetery – Dallas Morning News, 22 October 1957, p. 14

==== 1980s through 2000s ====
Oakland Ave name change – Dallas Morning News, November 13, 1997

Plotting a Course – Historic Cemetery seeks help preserving resting place of some of city's top names. Christine Wicker, Dallas Morning News, June 27, 1999, section A, p. 33

The Genealogical Society of Utah microfilmed the Oakland Cemetery interment and lot owner cards in 1998. These are now available in digital form on the Family Search website.

== Current state ==
A Dallas Morning News article announced that the cemetery was officially closed in August 2019 due to lack of operating funds. Now the Oakland Cemetery Lot Owners Association has new leadership. It meets annually in the spring. Its Board of Directors meets quarterly. The office at Oakland is closed, but the cemetery is open 9:00 a.m. to 5:00 p.m. daily. Oakland Cemetery's website includes the video "Forgotten Ground." The Oakland Cemetery Lot Owners Association placed the cemetery's records in the Dallas History and Archives Division of the J. Erik Jonsson Central Library.

== Notable burials ==
=== Mayors, state and national politicians ===
- Henry Ervay – mayor from 1870 to 1872
- Winship C. Connor – mayor from 1887 to 1894
- Franklin Pierce Holland – mayor from 1895 to 1897
- William Meredith Holland – mayor from 1911 to 915
- Louis Blaylock – mayor from 1923 to 1927
- Edwin Le Roy Antony – member of the United States House of Representatives (1892 to 1893)
- James Andrew Beall – U.S. congressman (1903 to 1915)
- Judge John Bookhout – Judge Fifth Court of Civil Appeals (15 years), Dallas Alderman in 1885 & 1886 for Ward 3 in Dallas.

=== Educators and others ===
Some Dallas schools were named for those buried at Oakland Cemetery.

- Florence Edna Rowe – High school English teacher, supervisor of penmanship and drawing
- Mary Frances "Lida" Hooe – Teacher, art supervisor
- Nancy Dickerson Moseley – primary teacher and primary supervisor
- James Albert Brooks – Superintendent from 1911 to 1914 (no school was named for him)
- Pauline Periwinkle (1863–1916), journalist, poet, teacher, feminist
- Dr. W. W. Samuell was originally interred at Oakland among his Samuell and Worthington family in Section 3. His remains were later removed to Hillcrest Mausoleum.

=== Artists, athletes, business and civil leaders ===
- John C. McCoy – described as first lawyer to practice law in Dallas. Texas Historic Marker placed in 1968. His remains were moved to Oakland Cemetery by his nephew John M. McCoy. This family is among the first buried at Oakland.
- Allie Victoria Tennant – sculptor of Indian archer at Hall of State, Fair Park
- Gordon Conway – Stage and. Costume designer.
- Harry Kinzy – baseball player
- Oscar Dugey – baseball player
- Charles Harrington – pitcher, hit and killed by baseball
- Louis Antonio Pires – wealthy banker born in Madeira Islands whose monument is one of the most outstanding in the cemetery. See photo above.
- Minyard Family – Minyard Food Stores
- John Franklin Strickland – President, Texas Power & Light; builder of Interurban line
- George W. Ware – Founder of Practical Drawing Company

=== Military ===
Oakland Cemetery is the burial location for many who served this country in the military. Mexican-American War (1), Civil War (68), Spanish American War (18), World War I and AEF (194), World War II (206,) Korea (17), Vietnam (10), and Military Service not specified (102) and Texas Rangers (2).

- Frank A. Beaumont – Texas Ranger (1880–1881)
- Henry Coleman – Texas Ranger (1858–1861)
- Richard Montgomery Gano – a Brigadier General in the Confederate States Army during the American Civil War. Texas State Historical Marker placed in 1963.
- James Bruton Gambrell – Confederate veteran, President of Southern Baptist Convention 1917–1920.

=== Ministers, medicine and scientists ===
- William M. Anderson, LLD – Minister, First Presbyterian Church (1894–1901, 1914–24)
- Henry Arthur Moseley, M.D. – one of the founders of Baylor Hospital
- Joseph Stephens Letcher, M.D. – called "chief spirit" for raising money the site for St. Paul Sanitarium.
- Rev. James W. Hill – Minister, First Methodist Church
- Rev. Alexander Charles Garrett, DD, LLD – Bishop, Episcopal Diocese of Dallas
- Jesse L. Gray – received a patent for short wave sound system for visual observation of aircraft and boats, 1936.

Also buried or memorialized at Oakland Cemetery

- Santos Rodriguez, the 12-yr old victim of a police killing.
- Willis A. and Sallie E (Crane ) Skinner who froze to death on Pike's Peak in August 1911.
- Dr. John B. Sawyer, who died in the 1900 Galveston Hurricane. His name is inscribed on his wife's tombstone.
- May Sawyer Howth, who died in the 1900 Galveston Hurricane. Her name is inscribed on her mother's tombstone.
- Some who helped establish Oakland Cemetery: Odd S. Riggen, William B. Gano, William H. Lewis, John P. Murphy, John S. Armstrong, and T. J. Oliver.

== Adjacent cemeteries ==
=== City Pauper Cemetery ===
The places for the city of Dallas to bury its pauper death were filling up by the early 1900s. The city officials received complaints about the downtown cemetery and the pauper section of Trinity cemetery (now called Greenwood Cemetery). So in 1901 the city council decided to purchase 6 acres from James A. Crawford and his wife Martha (Hord) Crawford. The land was alongside the newly opened Oakland Cemetery. The city arranged for any individual pauper who died within its boundaries or at the city hospital to be buried. It was not easy to get undertakers to use this rural cemetery. By 1906 former Mayor Barry reminded the city council that land had been purchased for a pauper cemetery. Mayor Curtis P. Smith instructed the city engineers to lay out the cemetery in two sections: one for white paupers and the other for Negroes. Death certificates as early as 1910 and the 1920 revised city code call this cemetery Mount Auburn. The name "city cemetery" continues to appear on death certificate at the same time. Today the City of Dallas calls this cemetery "Opportunity Cemetery," since the land is adjacent to Opportunity Park and is maintained by the City of Dallas Parks and Recreation Department. It is difficult to know exactly when burials began in this city cemetery/ (aka Mount Auburn) because the state did not required death certificate until 1908. The cemetery was replaced with a new pauper cemetery in northwest Dallas in 1932.

There are many death certificates that list Oakland Cemetery as the place of burial but for whom there is no record among the Oakland Cemetery interment records. It may be that undertakers listed the cemetery as Oakland on the death certificate because the city cemetery was located behind Oakland. One death certificate lists a cemetery as "Oakland Annex."

=== County Pauper Cemetery ===
Dallas county purchased 6 acres from James A. Crawford and his wife adjacent to the city's property in 1901. The county buried paupers who died in Dallas county but outside the city limits. Paupers from the county could be provided housing on the county poor farm. The farm had its own cemetery. In 1912 Southern Traction Company planned a right-of-way for the new interurban through the farm that bifurcated its cemetery. Dallas county buried many of those dying on the county farm in this new county pauper cemetery. Death certificates listing the cemetery as county cemetery or as Rest Haven (aka Resthaven) date from 1917. The county sold part of its cemetery property to a church; part is a ball park. The remainder on Pine and Electrical is still called Dallas County Pauper Cemetery. Adjacent to this is the Confederate Cemetery, which was first sold (given) to the Sons of Confederate Veterans.

=== Confederate Cemetery ===
Dallas County authorized the Sterling Price Confederate Veterans Camp to use a portion of the land from the Dallas County pauper cemetery for a Confederate cemetery. In 1936, the city of Dallas began caring for the Confederate cemetery. The cemetery is at the corner of Electra and Reed streets. In 1970 Dallas County officially deeded the cemetery to the city of Dallas for $1. The land adjacent to the cemetery bordering on Electra and Pine streets remains designated as part of Dallas County Pauper Cemetery in the Dallas County Appraisal District records.

== Photo gallery ==
Tombstones, monuments and other photos

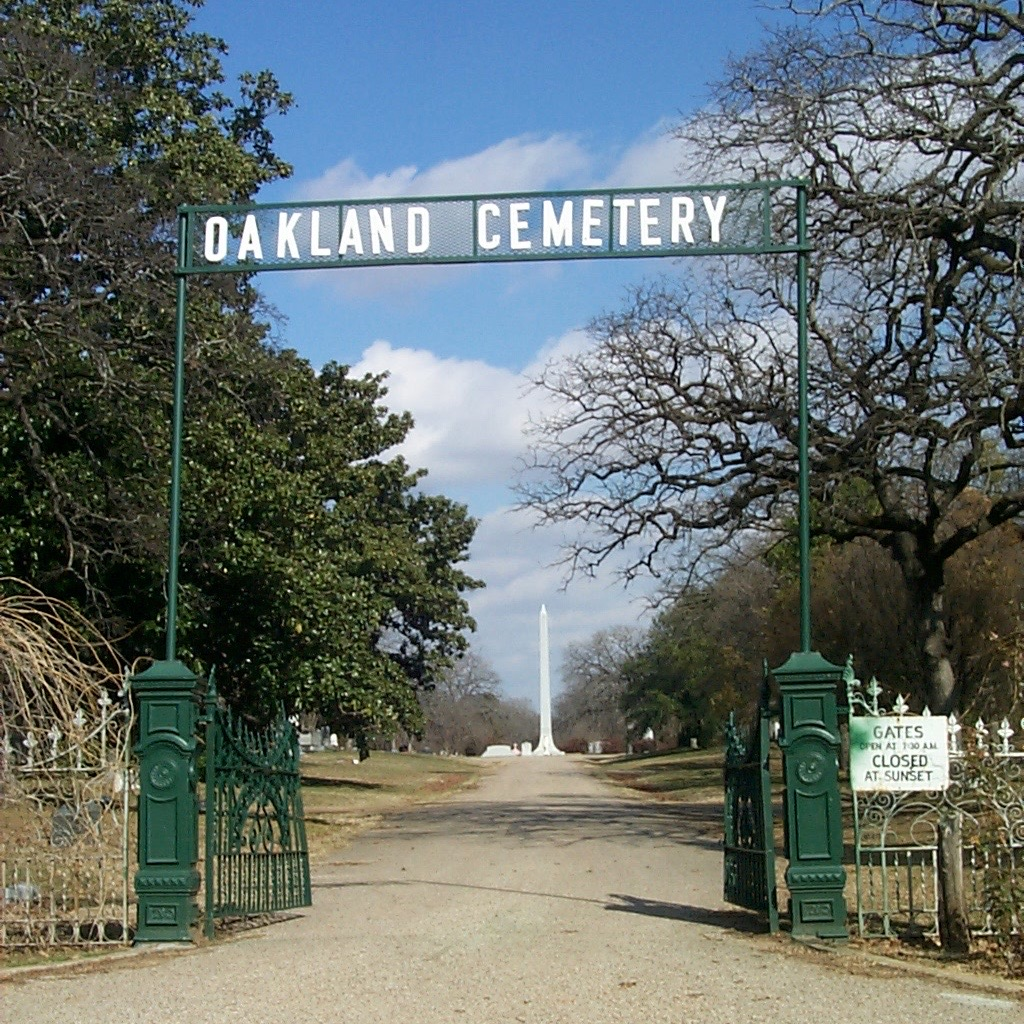
Entrance to Oakland Cemetery 2001

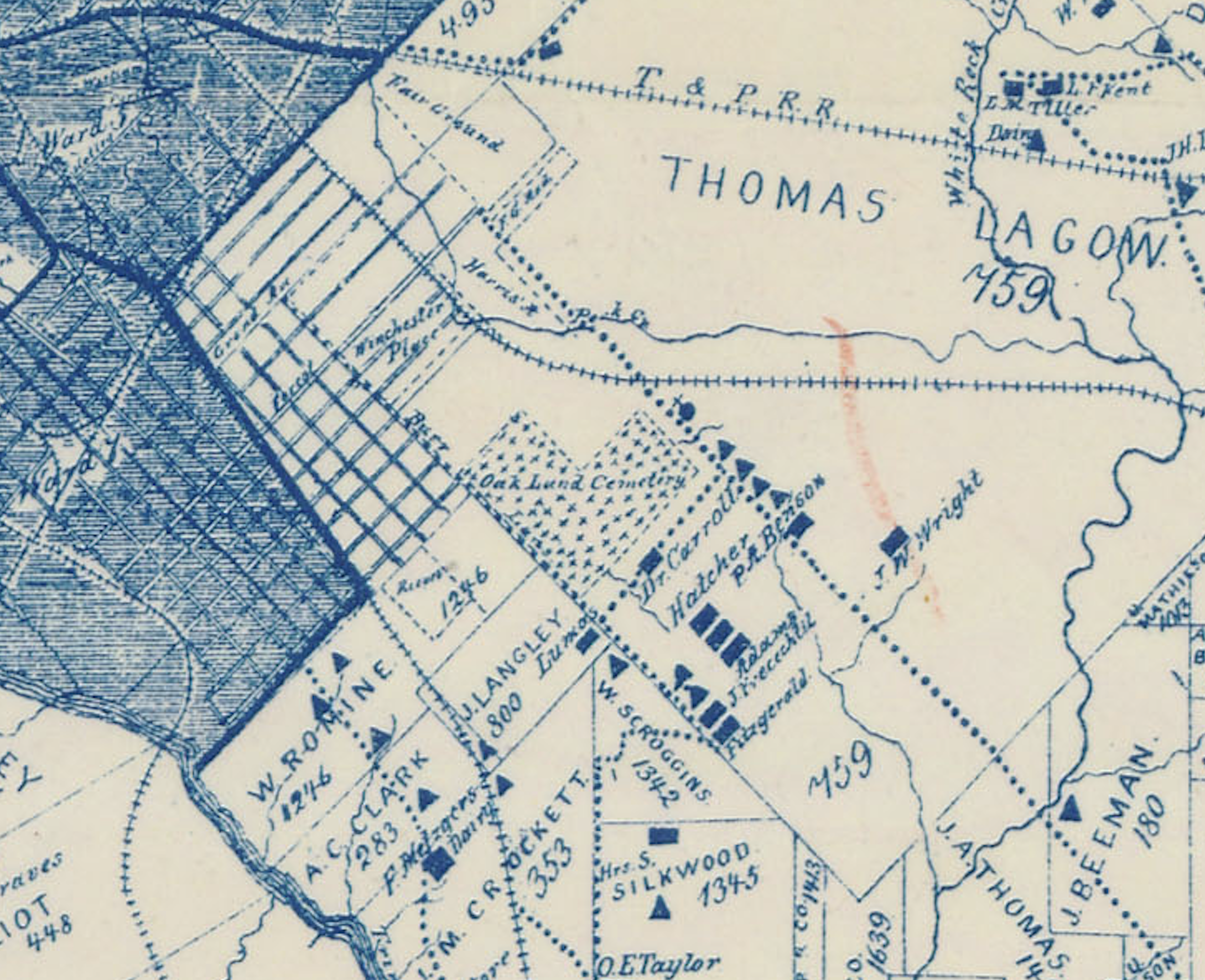
Oakland cemetery on 1900 Sam Street's map

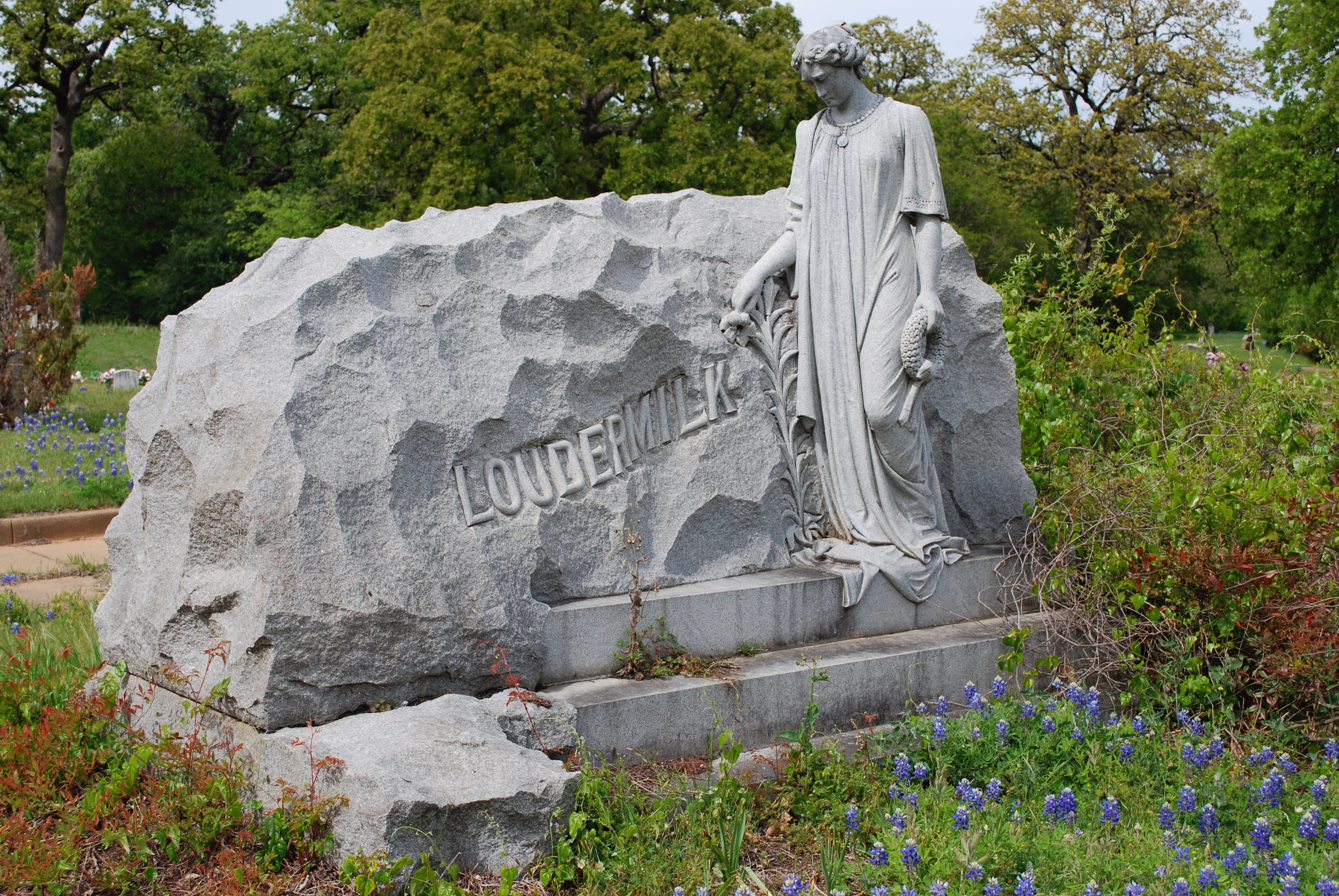
Loudermilk family monument

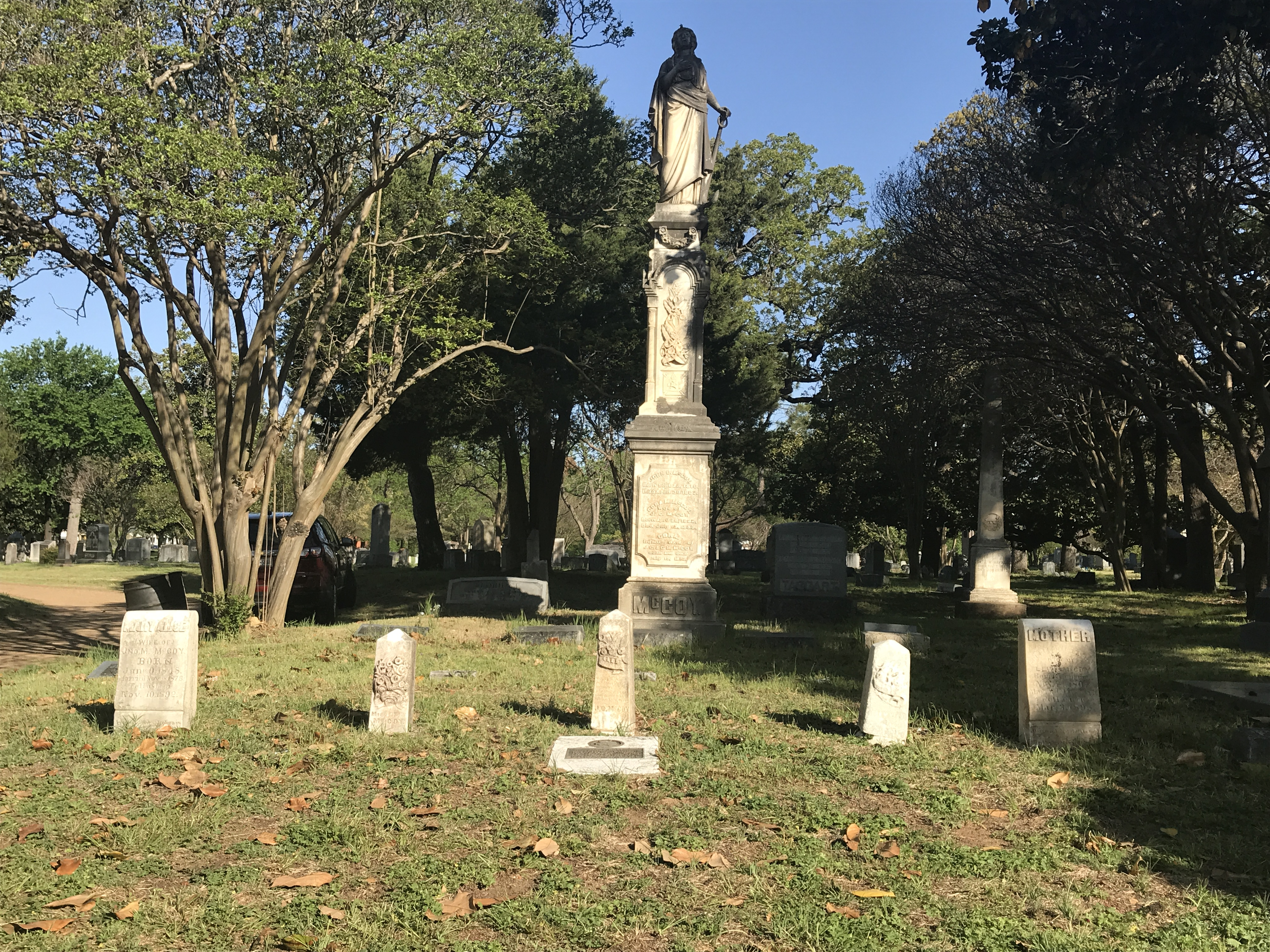
McCoy Lot – First lot purchased at Oakland.

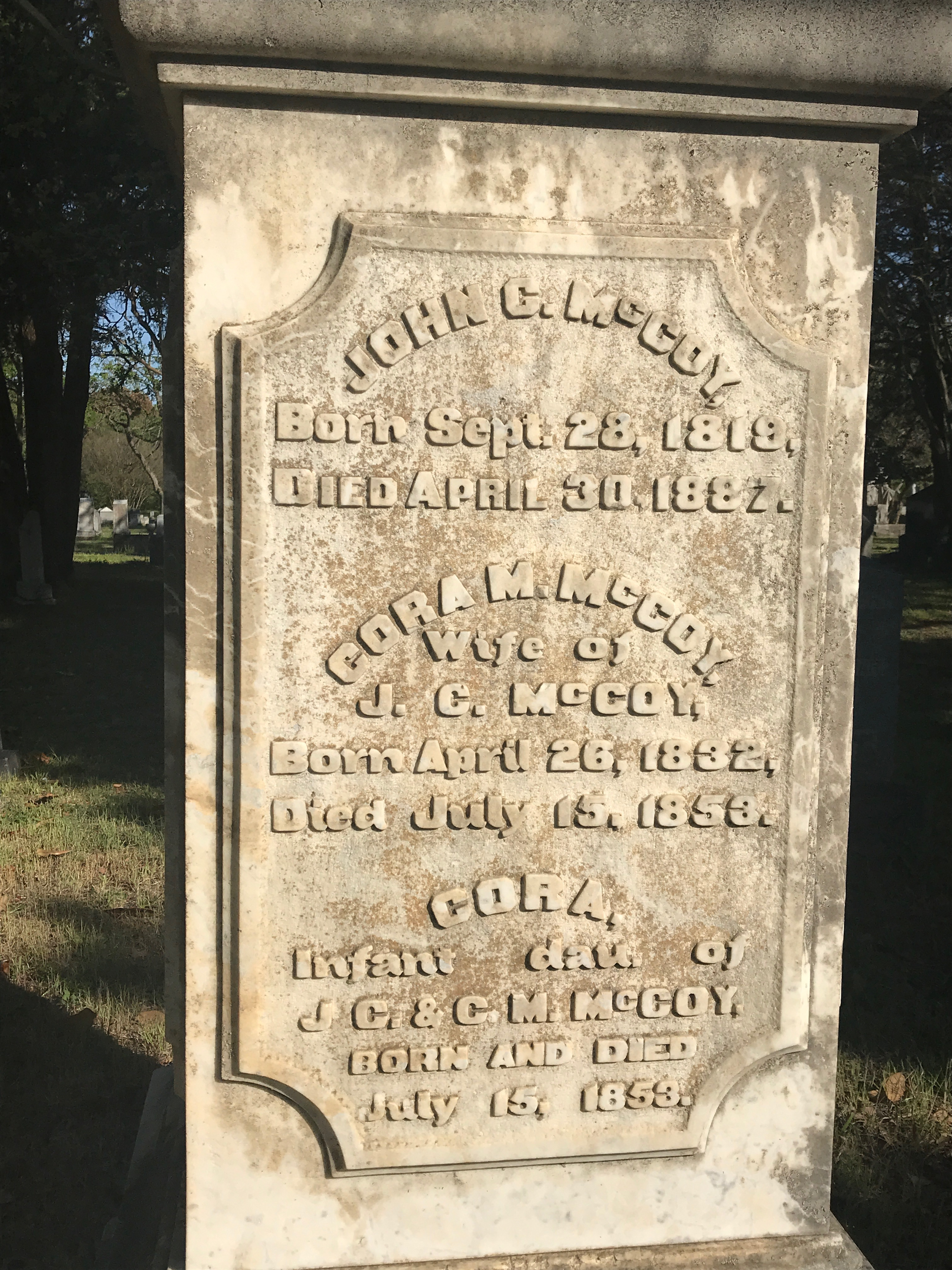
McCoy inscription on family marker

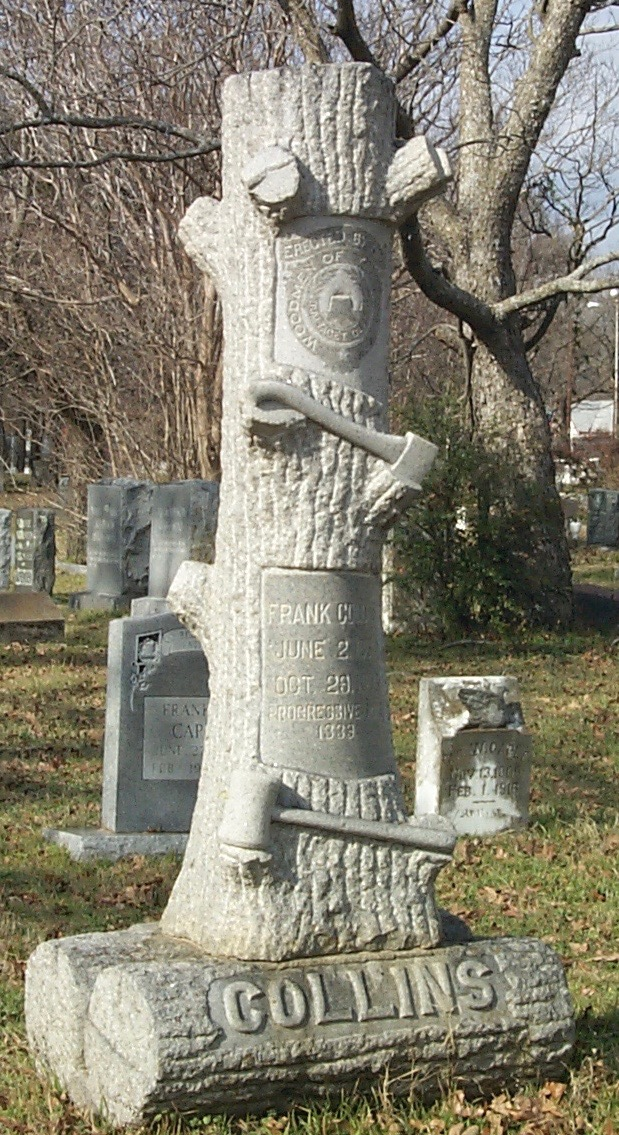
Woodman of the World marker – Frank Collins

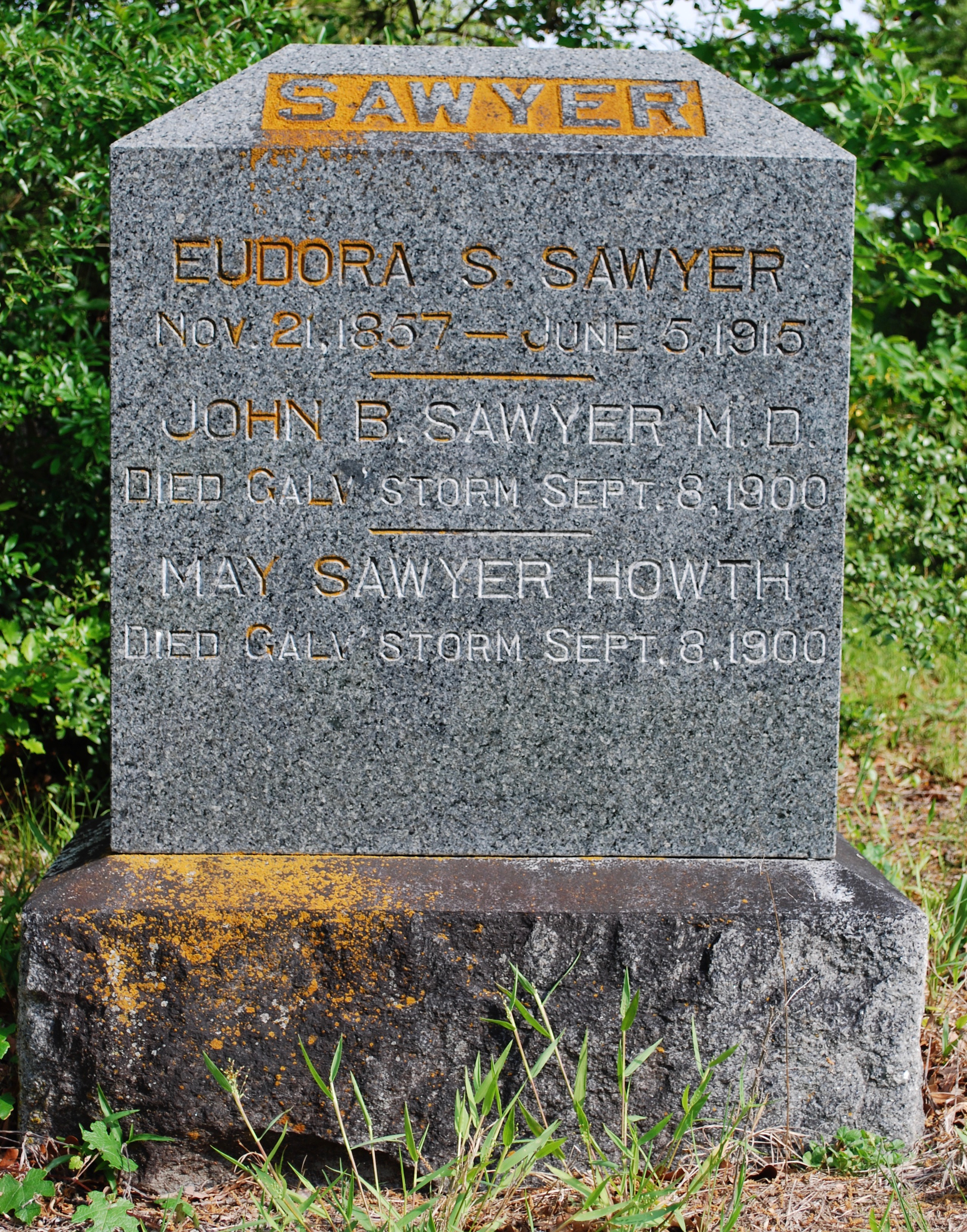
Cenotaph for two who died in 1900 Galveston storm

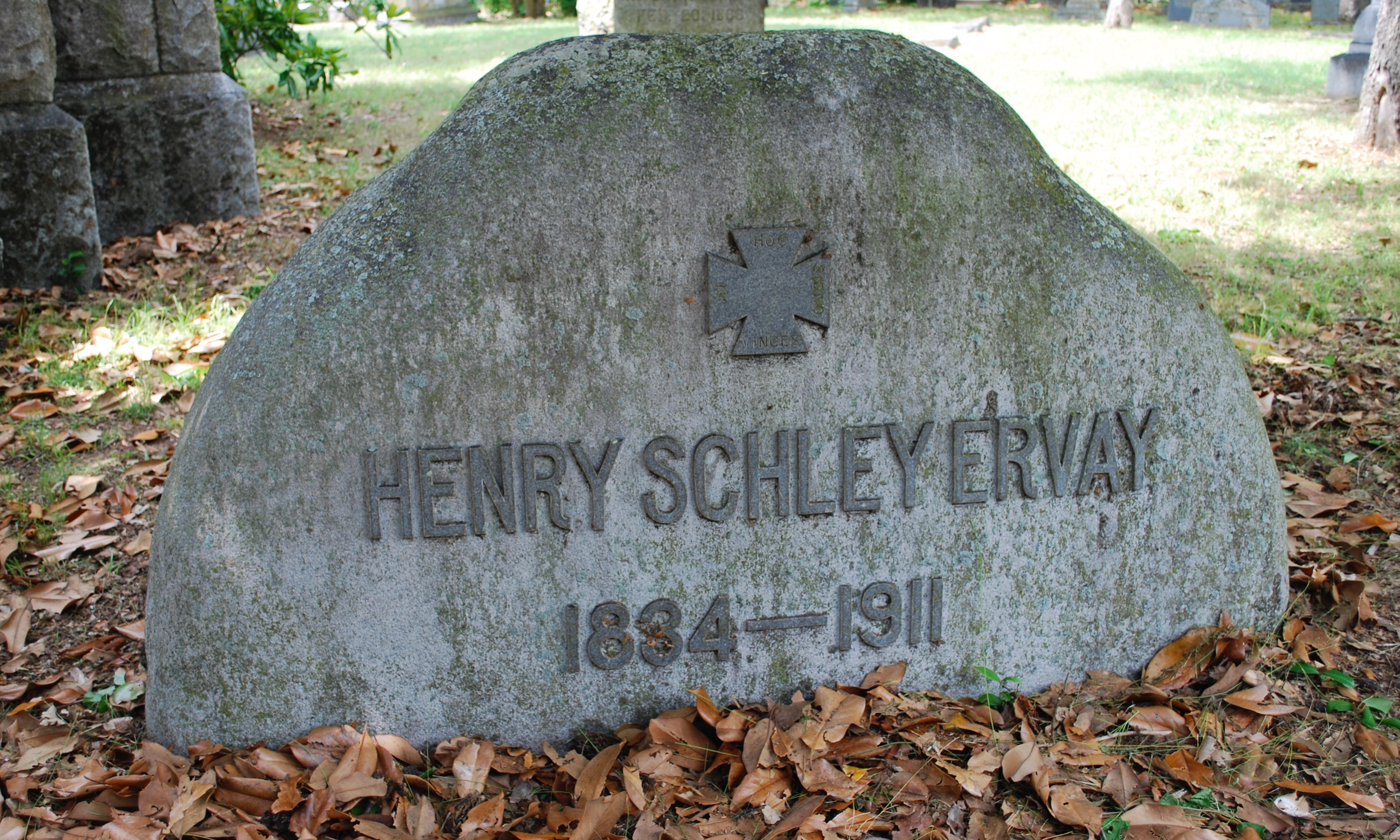
Tombstone for Mayor Henry S. Ervay

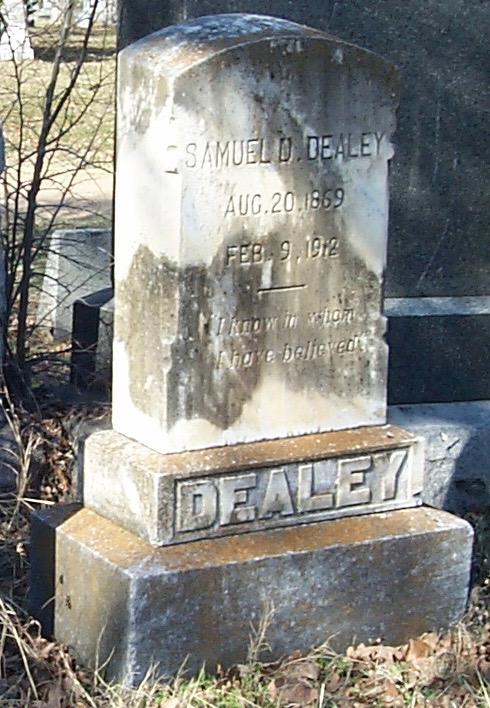
Samuel Dealey marker

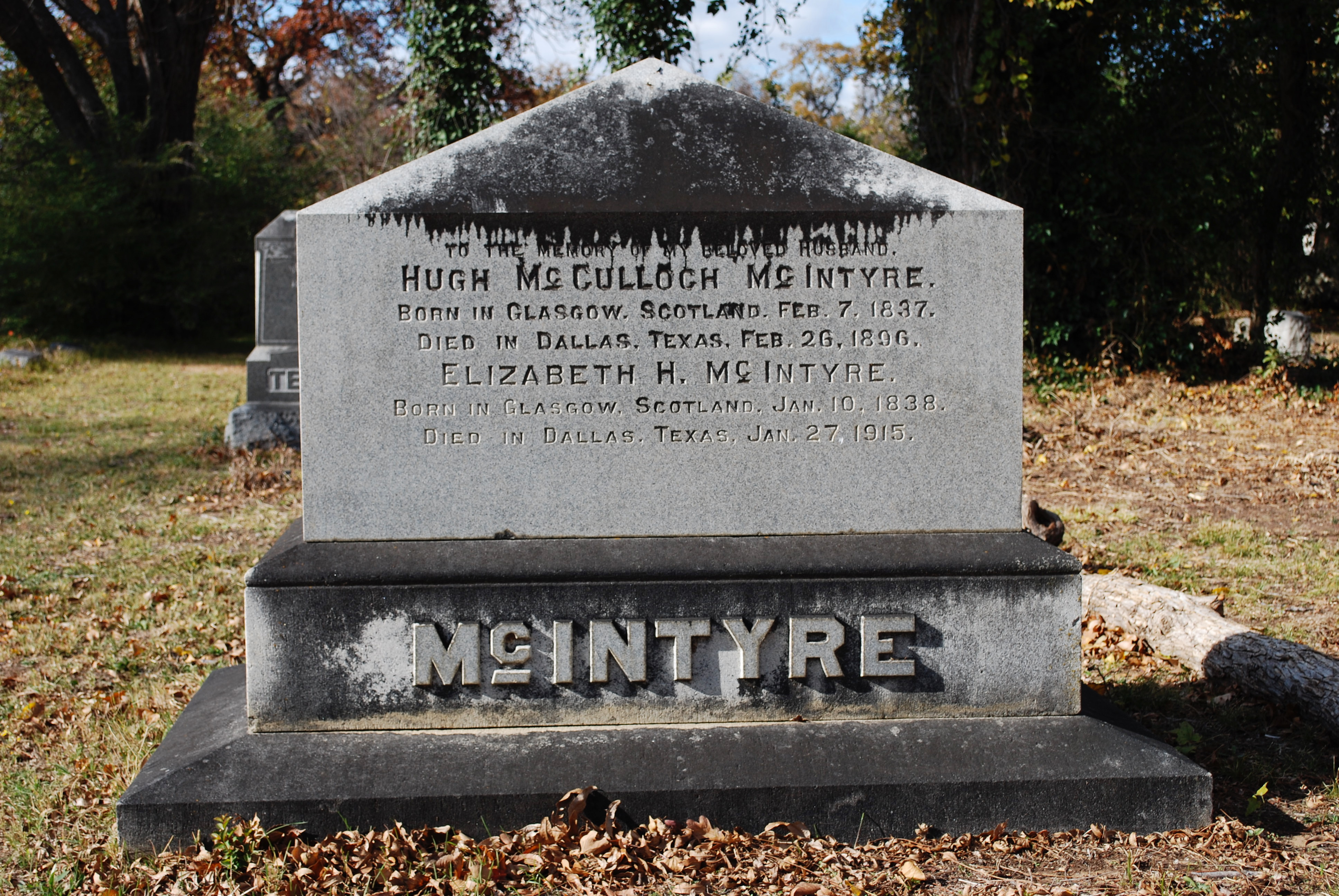
McIntyre double maker

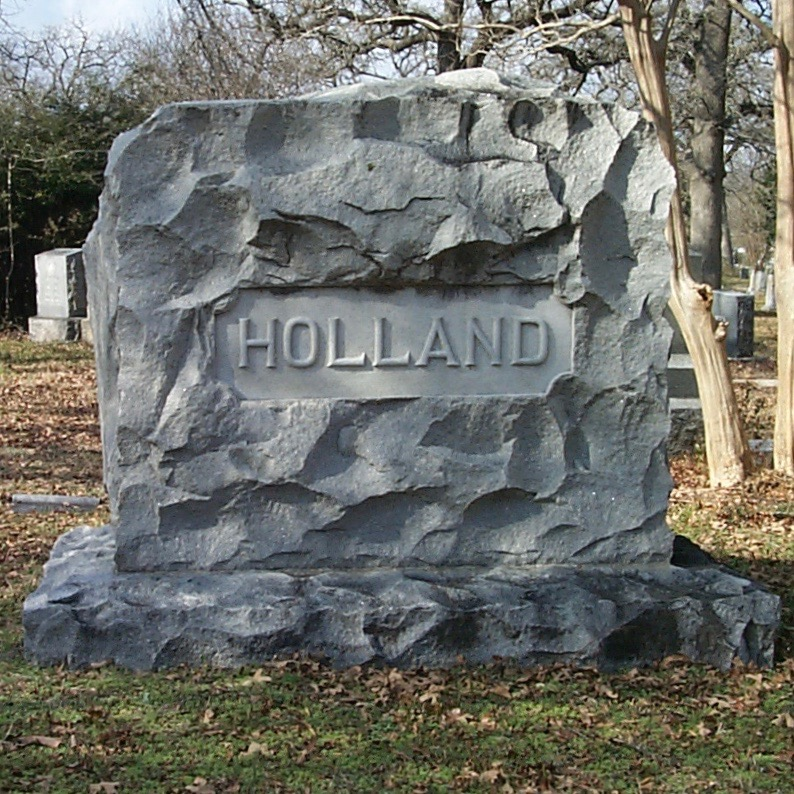
Holland family marker

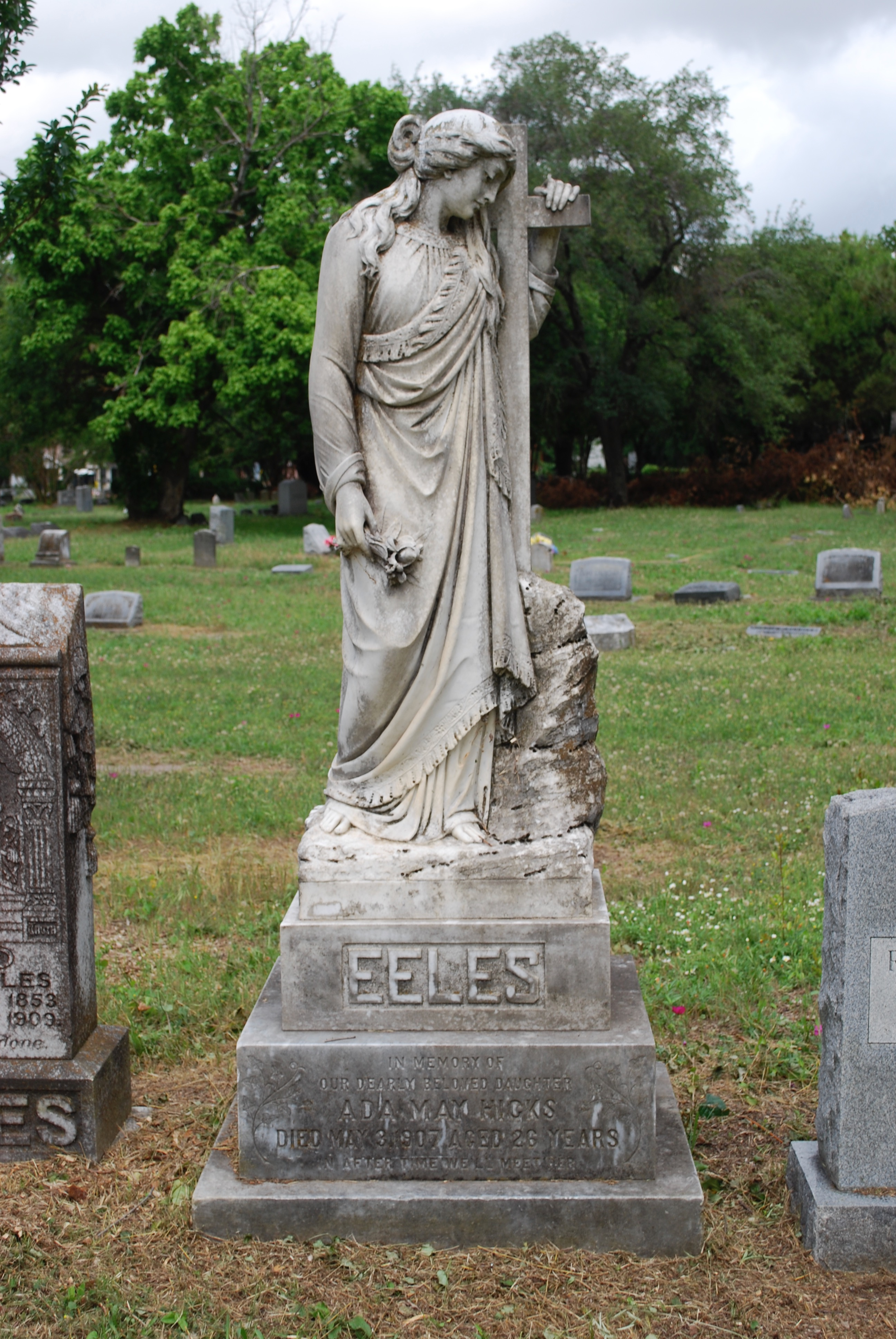
Eels family marker

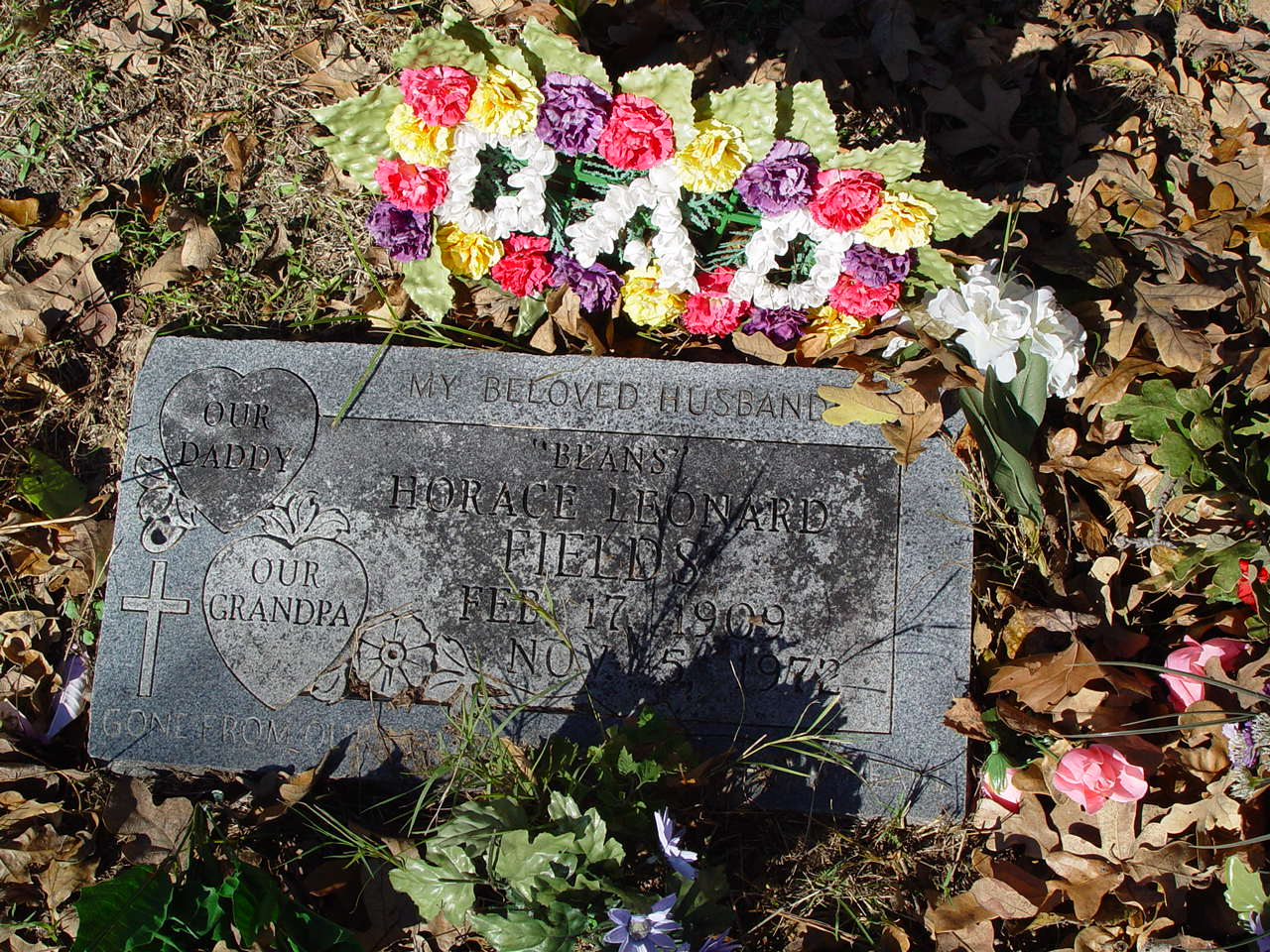
"Beans" Fields

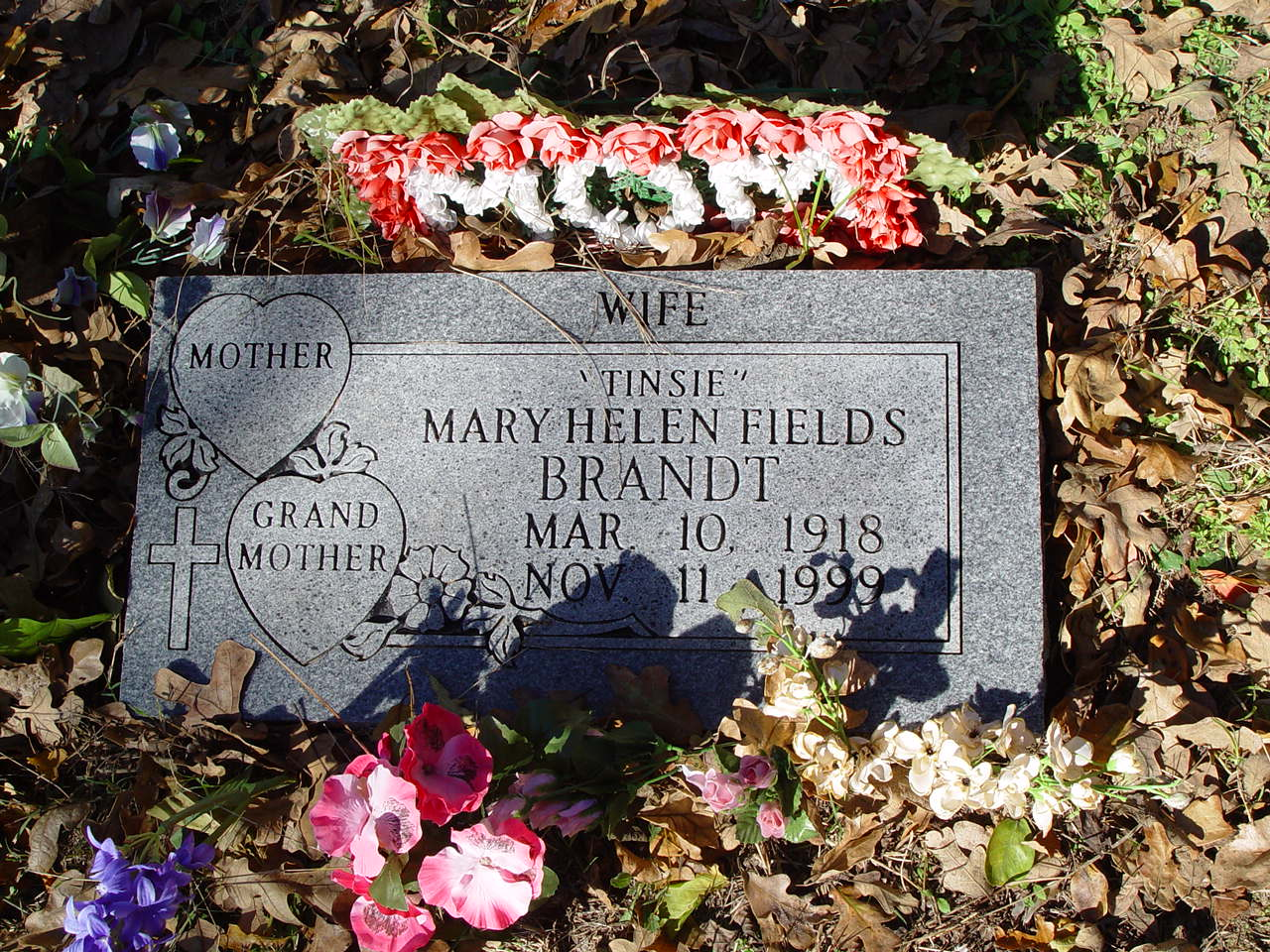
"Tinsie" Fields

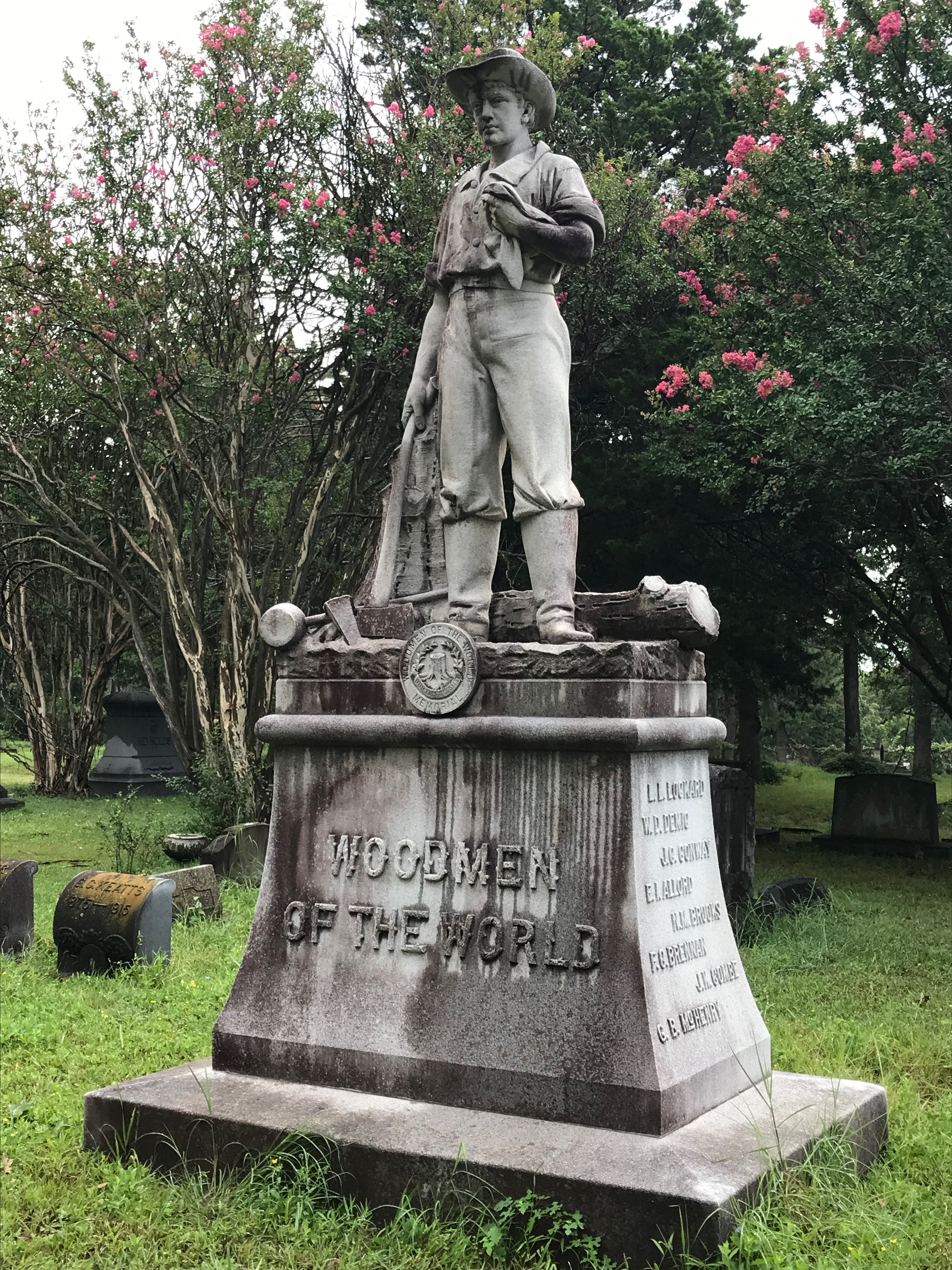
Woodmen of the World Monument

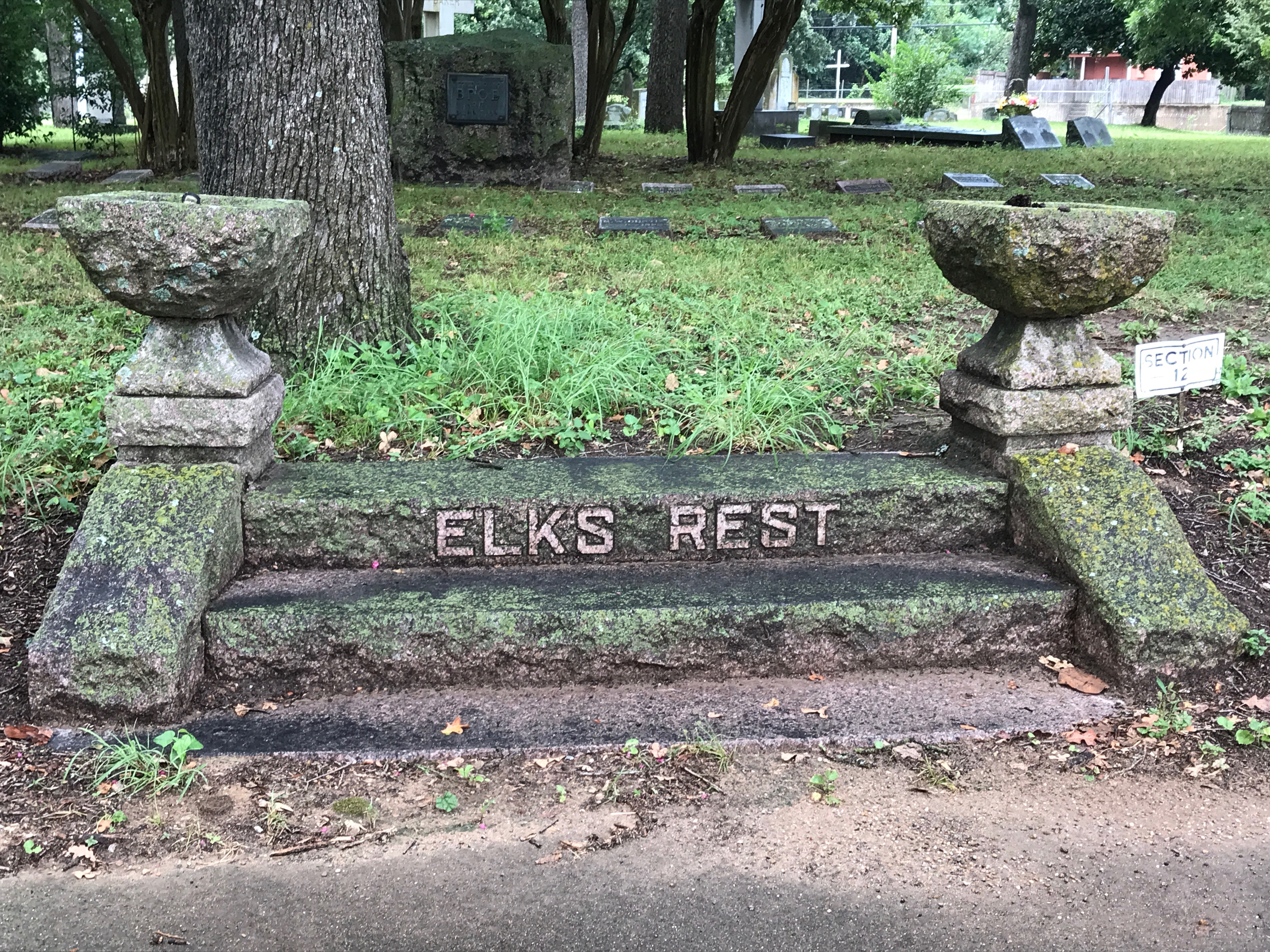
Steps to Elks Rest section

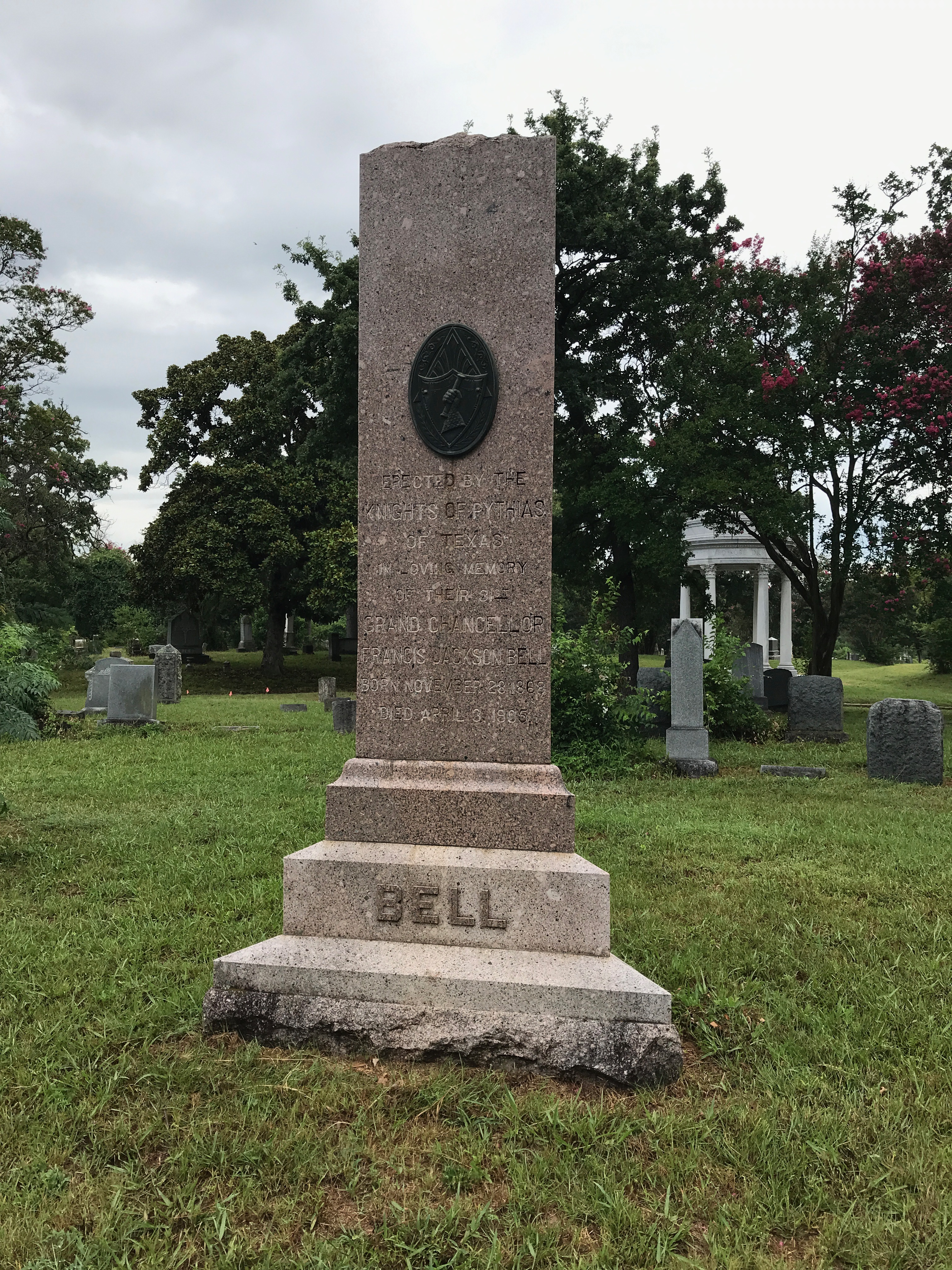
Knights of Pythias memorial for F J Bell

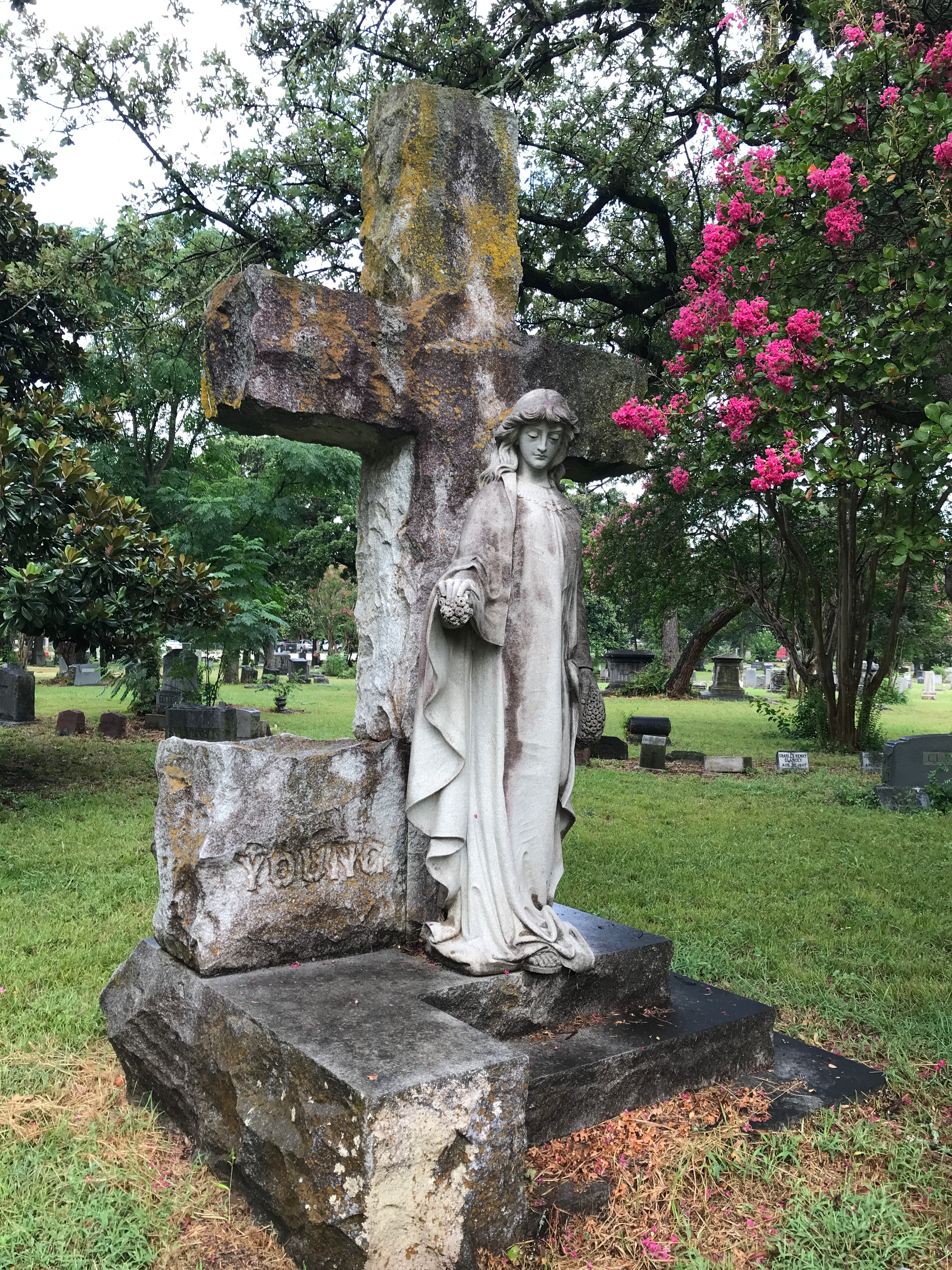
Woman and cross at Young-Witwer family lot
