= Artvoice =

- Artvoice logo
- Website type: Politics; News and opinion Art News
- Available in: English
- Owner: Jamie Moses, Frank Parlato, Jr.
- Founder: Jamie Moses
- Website: artvoice.com
- Registration: None
- Current status: Active

Artvoice began in Buffalo, New York, in 1990 as a free weekly print publication and quickly grew from 10,000 circulation to 65,000 circulation. A national newspaper auditing company gave the paper an audited monthly readership of 250,000, the readership is greater than the circ because as a weekly it gets passed around for days. Artvoice covered arts, theater, music, food, sports, politics, urban development and environmental issues in the Buffalo region. Artvoice first published content on Artvoice.com in 1996 and was one of first newspapers to include video on its website. It was founded by Jamie Moses in June, 1990. In 2010, Artvoice celebrated its 20th anniversary in its June edition with a time frame of the history of the publication.

In 2015, Moses took on a partner, something he'd long resisted. The new partnership signaled a change in the editorial direction of the newspaper to include more conservative views alongside the paper's traditional art and liberalism. It also celebrated its 25th anniversary in 2015 with a party that included music and dance performances and visual arts.

By 2017 the paper had to cease printing because of financial distress. Artvoice now releases its content at its website only, Artvoice.com. For many years, it was the only professional print competition to The Buffalo News distributed throughout the Buffalo metropolitan area.

For 26 years Artvoice hosted the "Arties" Awards, an event created by Moses and its theater editor Anthony Chase to celebrate excellence in local theater and to raise funds for AIDS organizations. Along with the Arties, the Give For Greatness campaign, its Mardis Gras Parade, and other Artvoice events, the paper raised and donated well over $1 million to local charities. When the print publication ceased and revenue shortfall threatened the existence of Artvoice, the Arties theater awards ceremony was given to the public NPR stations WNED/WBFO in 2017 to ensure its survival. Though the local NPR station produces it, the ceremony still retains the Artvoice title "The Arties". Artvoice also ran an annual "Best of Buffalo" competition where readers were able to nominate and vote for their favorite individuals, groups, or companies in dozens of categories including food, people, theater, fine art, and retail.

== Coverage of NXIVM Scandal ==
In 2017, Artvoice made national headlines for its reporting on the NXIVM scandal. Its coverage of the scandal has been hailed as instrumental in informing both the public and authorities about the cult's activities, which included a number of sex and financial crimes. The HBO miniseries The Vow, released in 2020, prominently features Artvoice editor in chief Frank Parlato.
