= Charles Campbell (Hawaii politician) =

American politician

- Campbell in 1964

Member of the Hawaii Senate from the 5th district
- In office 1979–1982

Member of the Hawaii House of Representatives from the 17th district
- In office 1977–1978

Member of the Honolulu City Council
- In office 1969–1971

Personal details
- Born: Charles Melton Campbell; 1918 North Carolina, U.S.
- Died: 1986 (aged 67–68) Honolulu, Hawaii, U.S.
- Party: Democratic
- Spouse: Naomi Charner
- Children: 1
- Alma mater: North Carolina College (BA); Howard University (MA); Columbia University (MA)

Charles Melton Campbell (1918–1986) was an American educator, broadcaster, civil rights activist and politician from Hawaii. A Democrat, he served on the Honolulu City Council from 1969 to 1971, in the Hawaii House of Representatives and in the Hawaii Senate. He participated in the 1965 Selma to Montgomery march.

== Early life and career ==
Campbell was born in North Carolina in 1918. He graduated from North Carolina College and earned master's degrees from both Howard University and Columbia University. While in college, he was executive secretary of the American Federation of Negro College Students. He began his career in Philadelphia, where he was one of the first Black newscasters in the city and the first Black member of the Radio Television News Directors Association.

Around 1955, Campbell moved with his wife to Honolulu, where Campbell worked as a newscaster for KGMB. He also worked as a part-time history teacher at Farrington High School and Kaimuki High School and coached the Leilehua High School debate team.

== Civil rights activism ==
While living in Honolulu, Campbell remained active in activism. In 1964 he organized a statewide campaign that sent 90,000 postcards from Hawaii residents to the United States Congress in support of the Civil Rights Act of 1964. That same year, he accompanied Abraham Akaka to Washington, D.C., to lobby for the bill's passage. In 1965 Campbell was part of the Hawaiian delegation to Selma for the Selma to Montgomery marches, bringing with them lei as gifts for the marchers. Campbell hand-delivered a lei to Martin Luther King Jr., who wore it during the march. Campbell was also an active participant in the United States Commission on Civil Rights, chairing its Hawaii Advisory Committee in addition to chairing the Civil Rights Conference of Hawaii.

Martin Luther King Jr. (center) and other marchers wearing lei at the Selma to Montgomery marches

== Political career ==
In 1968 Campbell was elected chair of the Oahu County Democratic Committee. That same year he won election to the Honolulu City Council, convincing his students at Farrington High School to rally in support of him. His campaign is credited by the Honolulu Star-Bulletin with being the first to deploy political sign waving in Hawaii. He served on the council until 1971. While on the council, he helped establish the University of Hawaii at Manoa's medical school.

He was elected president of the Hawaii State Teachers Association in 1973 and led the union in a statewide teachers' strike. In 1976, he won election to the Hawaii House of Representatives and in 1978 he was elected to the Hawaii Senate.

== Personal life ==
Campbell was married to Naomi Charner, who he met through their shared advocacy with the American Federation of Negro College Students. The two had one daughter. Campbell died in 1986.
