= Charles Augustus Rosenheimer Campbell =

American physician

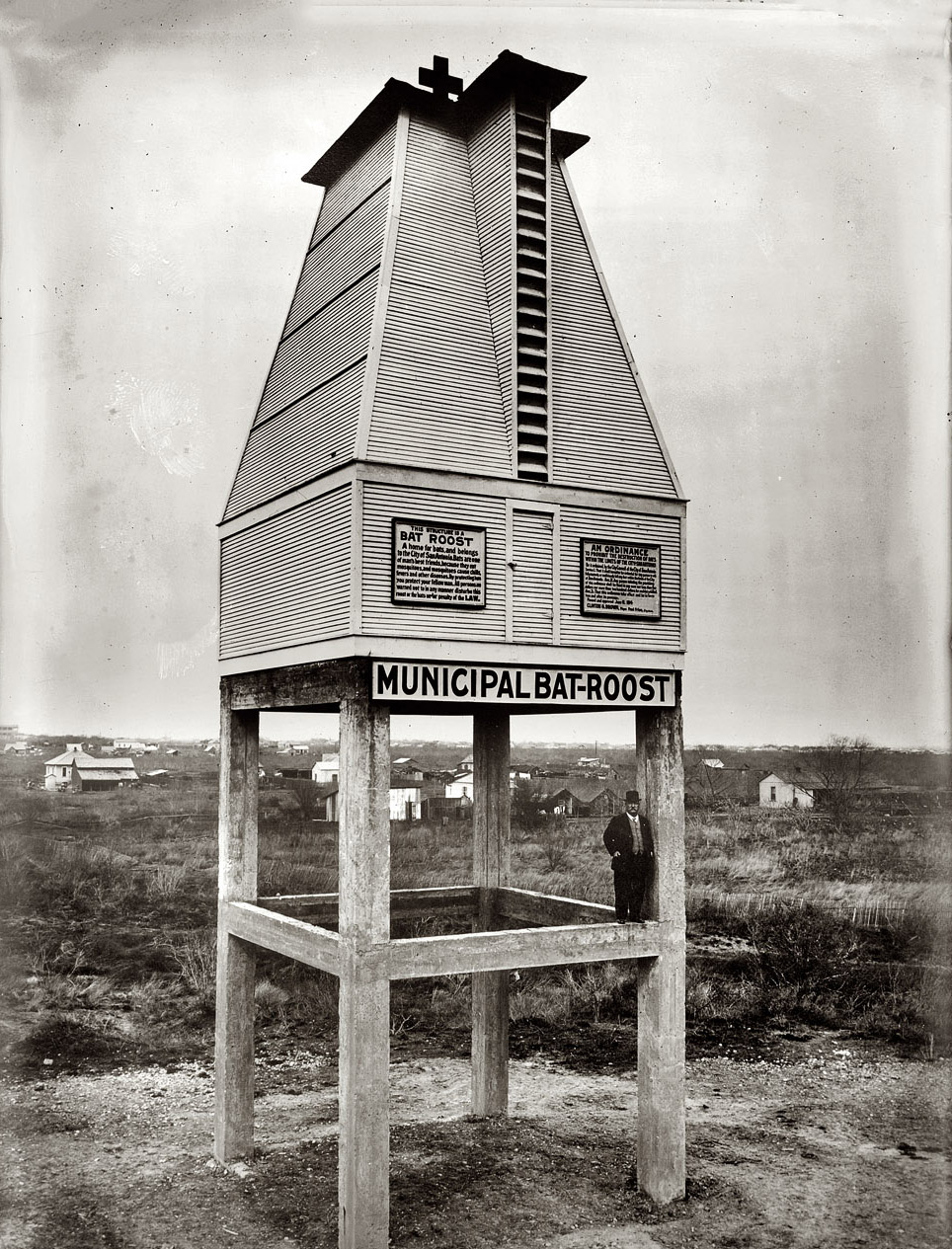
Bat roost with Campbell in San Antonio, Texas in 1915

Charles Augustus Rosenheimer Campbell Sr., M.D. (December 29, 1863 – February 22, 1931) was president of the San Antonio Academy of Medicine and bacteriologist for San Antonio, Texas. His medical interests in mosquitoes as disease vectors led him to appreciate bats as a way to reduce mosquito populations.

== Biography ==
He was born on December 29, 1863, in San Antonio, Texas to Martin Hifield Campbell (1824–1874) and Dolores Barrera (1829–1890). He attended Tulane University and received an M.D. He married Ida Hoyer (1864-1926), and they had three children, Julius R. Campbell (1886–1887), Charles Augustus Rosenheimer Campbell Jr. (1889–1911), and Milton Francis Campbell (1892–1942). In 1925 he published Bats, Mosquitoes, and Dollars. He died on February 22, 1931, in San Antonio, Texas.

== Publications ==
- Bats, Mosquitoes, and Dollars (1925)
