= General Cabell =

General Cabell may refer to:

- Charles P. Cabell (1903–1971), United States Air Force general
- DeRosey Caroll Cabell (1861–1924), United States Army major general
- William Lewis Cabell (1827–1911), Confederate States Army brigadier general
