= Katie Cabell Currie Muse =

President General of the United Daughters of the Confederacy

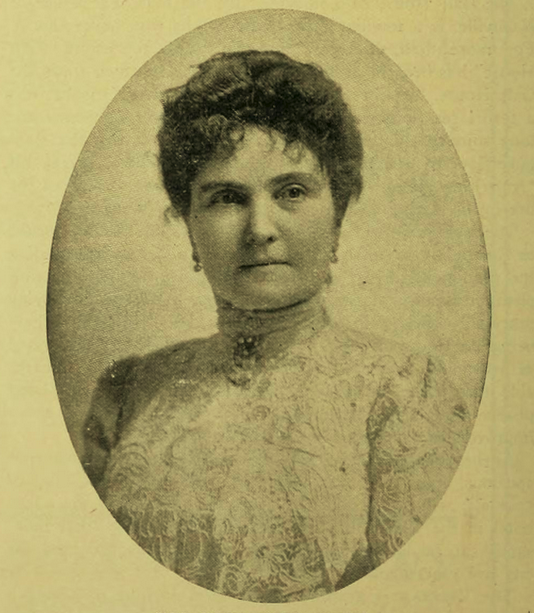

President General of the United Daughters of the Confederacy
- In office 1897–1899
- Preceded by: Elizabeth Childress Brown

Personal details
- Born: Katie Doswell Cabell; January 6, 1861 Fort Cobb, Indian Territory, U.S.
- Died: July 19, 1927 (aged 66) Dallas, Texas, U.S.
- Resting place: Greenwood Cemetery
- Spouse(s): J. R. Currie; J. C. Muse
- Parents: William Lewis Cabell (father); Harriet A. Rector (mother)
- Relatives: Ben E. Cabell (brother); Charles P. Cabell (nephew); Earle Cabell (nephew)

Katie Doswell Cabell Currie Muse (January 6, 1861 – July 19, 1927) was an American socialite who served as President General of the United Daughters of the Confederacy from 1897 to 1899.

== Early life and family ==
Muse was born Katie Doswell Cabell on January 6, 1861 in Fort Cobb to William Lewis Cabell and Harriet A. Rector. Her father served as an officer in the Confederate States Army during the Civil War. In the early 1870s, the family moved to Dallas, Texas, where her father opened a law office and was later elected mayor. Following her mother's death, Muse fulfilled the role of hostess in her father's home. She often hosted Confederate veterans and Varina Anne Davis, daughter of Confederate president Jefferson Davis.

== Lineage societies ==
Muse was a member of the Colonial Dames of America, the Daughters of the American Revolution, the United States Daughters of 1812, and the United Daughters of the Confederacy.

=== United Daughters of the Confederacy ===
Muse organized a Dallas chapter for the UDC. She organized the Texas Division of the UDC on May 25, 1896 in Victoria, Texas. Muse served as the president of the Texas Division. She also served as the national organization's vice president. Muse was elected as the President General of the UDC and served in that office from 1897 to 1899.

== Personal life ==
She married twice, first in 1889 to J. R. Currie and secondly in 1907 to J. C. Muse.

Muse died in Dallas on July 19, 1927.
