= J. W. Crowdus =

American physician

John William Crowdus

19th Mayor of Dallas
- In office 1881–1883
- Preceded by: J. J. Good
- Succeeded by: William L. Cabell

Personal details
- Born: July 6, 1828 Franklin, Kentucky, U.S.
- Died: September 11, 1895 (aged 67) Dallas, Texas, U.S.
- Spouse(s): Fannie Bell Hammond; Margaret Adeline Lindsey
- Children: 6
- Education: St. Louis Medical College
- Occupation: Physician

Military service
- Allegiance: Confederate States of America
- Branch/service: Confederate States Army
- Rank: Surgeon
- Unit: 3rd Missouri Infantry

John William Crowdus (July 6, 1828 – September 11, 1895) was an American physician and politician who served as the 19th Mayor of Dallas from 1881 to 1883.

== Early life and education ==
Crowdus was born July 6, 1828, in Franklin, Kentucky, United States, to Mark Crowdus and Frances Bush Eubank. Crowdus attended St. Louis Medical College at Washington University in St. Louis.

== Career ==
Crowdus practiced medicine in Robertson County, Tennessee, and Neosho, Newton County, Missouri, before coming to Texas. He joined the 3rd Missouri Infantry Regiment as a surgeon. He appears on a list of Confederate soldiers in hospital at Elm Springs, Arkansas paroled by G. W. Kelly, Major 4th Cavalry Regt., Missouri on November 2, 1862.

After the Civil War, Crowdus and family moved to Dallas, Texas where established a medical practice and became involved in civic affairs. He was elected to the Dallas City Council in 1875 and served until 1878. In 1881, he was elected mayor of Dallas and served until 1883. Crowdus was also a prominent druggist and established a wholesale firm, J.W. Crowdus Drug Company in 1884.

== Personal life ==
He married Fannie Hammond in 1849. They had six children. Their daughter, Elizabeth, married Thomas Marsalis, a land developer and founder of Oak Cliff. After the death of his first wife in 1885, Crowdus married Margaret Adeline Lindsey Bickham.

He died September 11, 1895, in Dallas from blood poisoning as a result of a leg injury. He was interred at Pioneer Cemetery.
