= J. M. Howell =

American horticulturist and politician (1849–1925)

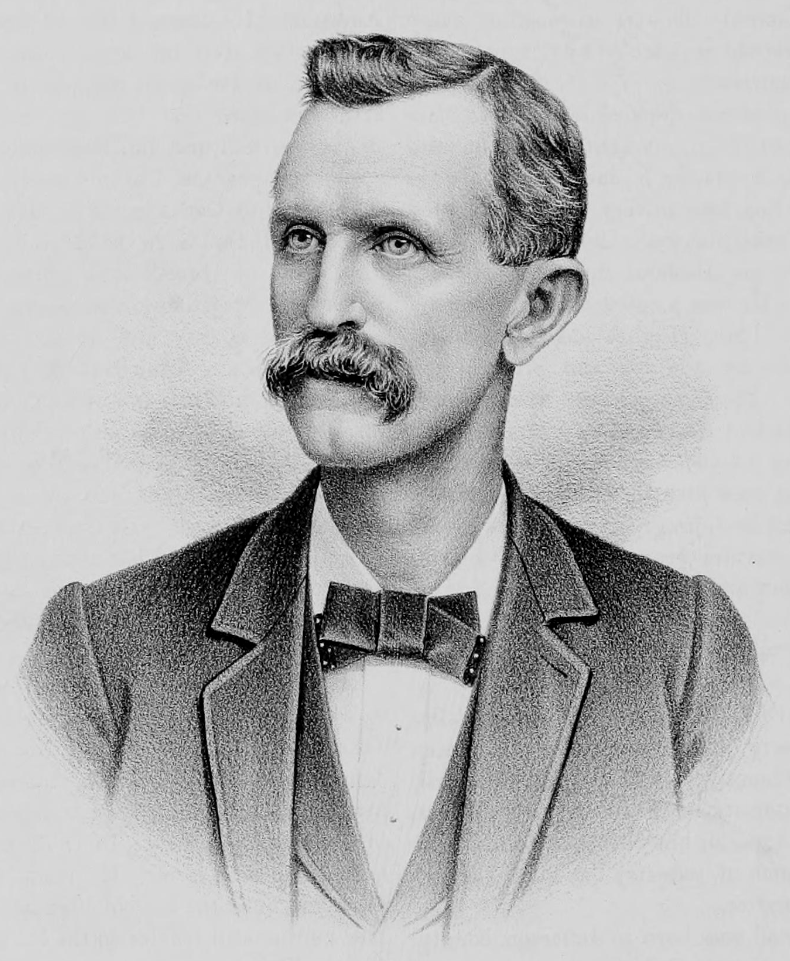
- Born: John Marshman Howell; August 2, 1849; Jefferson County, Tennessee
- Died: November 8, 1925 (aged 76); Dallas, Texas
- Burial place: Greenwood Cemetery
- Occupation(s): Horticulturist, politician

Signature
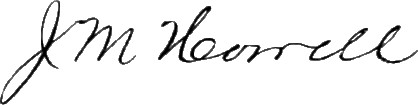

John Marshman Howell (1849–1925) was a horticulturist and alderman in Dallas, Texas.

== Biography ==
J. M. Howell was born in Jefferson County, Tennessee on August 2, 1849. In 1872, he settled on a tract of land along McKinney Avenue where he planted orchards and opened a greenhouse. He was one of Dallas' most civic-minded and progressive citizens, serving on the Dallas School Board for 10 years. He served several terms as the President of the Texas State Horticultural Society and was active in the planning of the Texas State Fair. He served as secretary and treasurer of the Texas State Nurserymen's Association, and treasurer of the Central Texas Horticultural Society.

Following his return from the Philadelphia Exposition in 1876, Howell made plans for his property that would reflect the beauty he saw in Philadelphia. He is credited with planting the first magnolia tree in Dallas. A few of his trees can still be found at Howell Park.

He died at his son's home in Dallas on November 8, 1925.

== Legacy ==
Howell Park

Howell Park is the neighborhood immediately Northwest of the intersection of Hall and Howell Streets. Today the neighborhood custodian is the Howell Park Homeowners Association, a non-profit organization.

Several streets in Dallas were named with his influence: Routh (after his wife's family), Howell, Fairmount (after Fairmount Park, the site of the Philadelphia Exposition), Maple and Thomas Street (after his uncle). John was laid to rest in Greenwood Cemetery, adjacent to Howell Park.

== Works ==
- Catalogue of Texas raised fruit, shade and ornamental trees, grapes, vines, roses, flowering shrubs, etc. 1888 – via archive.org.
- Catalogue of Texas raised fruit, shade and ornamental trees, grapes, vines, roses, flowering shrubs, etc. 1889 – via archive.org.
- Dallas Nurseries
