= John H. Traylor =

American mayor

John Henry Traylor

26th Mayor of Dallas
- In office 1898–1900
- Preceded by: Bryan T. Barry
- Succeeded by: Ben E. Cabell

Personal details
- Born: March 27, 1839 Traylorsville, Henry County, Virginia, US
- Died: March 19, 1925 (aged 86) Harlandale, San Antonio, Texas, US
- Spouse: Pauline Lockett
- Children: Paul, Robert H., Gooch, Ruby, Paul H., Harry, Leslie, and Royal Lockett
- Occupation: Developer, civic leader

Military service
- Allegiance: Confederate
- Branch/service: Co B, 4th Georgia Regiment
- Years of service: 1861–1864
- Battles/wars: Warrenton, Spotsylvania Courthouse, Chancellorville

John Henry Traylor (March 27, 1839 – March 19, 1925), politician, developer, was mayor of Dallas in 1898–1900.

== Biography ==
John Henry Traylor was born March 27, 1839, in Traylorsville, Henry County, Virginia, to Robert Bailey Traylor and Celia R. Mullins. His family moved to Georgia when he was a child. His father served in the Georgia legislature.

John Traylor served in Co. B., 4th Georgia regiment during the Civil War being wounded a number of times. He moved to Jefferson, Texas, around 1867 where he became a merchant. He married Pauline Lockett, daughter of Royal Lockett and Martha Smith on December 1, 1869, in Jefferson, Marion County, Texas. They had eight children: Paul (died aged 2 years), Robert Hill, Gooch, Ruby, Paul H. (father-in-law of Eric Lansdown Trist), Harry, Leslie, and Royal Lockett.

Traylor and his wife moved to Granbury, Texas, around 1871. There he first founded a private bank and loan company in Granbury with Daniel C. Cogdell; then the First National Bank of Granbury. He was sheriff of Hood County from 1876 to 1880. He was elected to the Texas House of Representatives, 17th Legislature in 1881, and to the Texas Senate from the 30th District in 1883. He moved to Dallas in 1887. He was mayor of Dallas from 1898 to 1900.

Traylor, his wife and a son moved to Rockport, Texas, in 1907. Historical markers document his efforts in Aransas Pass, Texas: Aransas Hotel and National Bank of Aransas Pass (now ValueBank Texas).

He died March 19, 1925, in Harlandale, Bexar County, Texas, and was interred at Greenwood Cemetery, Dallas, Texas.
