= Ben E. Cabell =

American sheriff & mayor (1858–1931)

27th Mayor of Dallas
- In office 1900–1904
- Preceded by: John H. Traylor
- Succeeded by: Bryan T. Barry

Dallas County Sheriff
- In office 1892–1900
- Preceded by: William Henry Lewis
- Succeeded by: Lee H. Hughes

Personal details
- Born: Benjamin Elias Cabell; November 18, 1858 Fort Smith, Arkansas
- Died: February 8, 1931 (aged 72) Fort Sam Houston, Bexar County, Texas
- Resting place: Greenwood Cemetery, Dallas, Texas
- Spouse: Sadie E. Pearre
- Relations: Katie Cabell Currie Muse (sister)
- Children: 4, including Charles P. Cabell and Earle Cabell
- Parent(s): William Lewis Cabell; Harriet Amanda Rector
- Occupation: Sheriff

Benjamin Elias Cabell (November 18, 1858 – February 8, 1931), attorney, was mayor of Dallas from 1900 to 1904.

== Biography ==
Benjamin Elias Cabell was born November 18, 1858, in Fort Smith, Arkansas, the oldest of eight children - of which 5 survived infancy - to the then future C.S. Army Brigadier General William Lewis Cabell and Harriet Amanda Rector. In December 1872, he and his brothers and sisters were moved by his parents from Arkansas to Texas where the family would maintain their roots for the remainder of the 19th and through the 20th centuries.

He married Sadie E. Pearre, daughter of Judge Charles Baer Pearre and Harriet “Hallie” Kelly Earle, on November 26, 1896, in Waco, Texas. They had three surviving sons: Ben Elias Cabell, Jr., Charles Pearre Cabell, and Earle Cabell. A fourth son, William Lewis Cabell, who would have been the oldest, died at birth.

He spent part of his youth as a mining prospector in New Mexico, Arizona, California, and Lower California (Mexico). He returned to Dallas and entered the livery business. When his father was appointed U.S. Marshall for the Northern District of Texas, he was appointed Deputy Marshall. He was elected Sheriff of Dallas County in 1892 and held the office until 1900. He was elected mayor in 1900. His father, William Lewis Cabell, and his son, Earle Cabell, also served the city as mayor. While mayor he oversaw the construction of Bachman Lake dam as part of the city water system. He was director of the State Fair of Texas, chairman of the State Penitentiary Board. He was a member of the Sons of the Confederacy, Knights of Pythias and the Elks.

On February 8, 1931, Ben E. Cabell died at Fort Sam Houston, Bexar County, Texas. He was interred at Greenwood Cemetery, Dallas, Texas.
