= Greenwood Cemetery (Dallas) =

Cemetery in Dallas County, Texas

- Interactive map of Greenwood Cemetery

Details
- Established: 1875
- Location: 3020 Oak Grove Ave; Dallas, TX
- Country: United States
- Coordinates: 32°48′04″N 96°47′53″W; GNIS: Greenwood Cemetery
- Type: Non-denominational
- Owned by: Greenwood Cemetery Association
- Find a Grave: Greenwood Cemetery

Greenwood Cemetery is privately owned non-denominational cemetery located at 3020 Oak Grove Avenue in the Uptown neighborhood of Dallas, Texas. Founded in 1875 as the Trinity Cemetery, the first burial was a Mrs. Susan Bradford that March. It is one of the oldest cemeteries in the city of Dallas. It is part of a cemetery tour, and sits next to the Emanu-El Cemetery, the Calvary Cemetery, and the Freedman's Cemetery Memorial.

== History ==
At the time of its founding, the cemetery was out of town and surrounded by farmland. By 1896, the cemetery had fallen into disrepair with one local noting: "The fence is down in twenty places, cattle roam all over the graves and wagons use the main street as a common thoroughfare." This prompted the formation of the Greenwood Cemetery Association, which took over the maintenance and operation of the cemetery and gave it its current name.

== Notable burials ==
- Vivian Louise Aunspaugh (1869–1960), painter and art teacher
- Jacob Boll (1828–1880), naturalist and entomologist
- John Henry Brown (1820–1895), newspaper publisher and member of the Texas legislature
- Nathaniel Macon Burford (1824–1898), politician, Speaker of the Texas House of Representatives
- Robert Emmet Burke (1847–1901), US Congressman
- Ben E. Cabell (1858–1931), mayor of Dallas
- William Lewis Cabell (1827–1911), mayor of Dallas
- John Riley Duncan (1850–1911), Texas Ranger and Bounty Hunter
- J. M. Howell (1849–1925), Dallas city alderman
- Levin Major Lewis (1832–1886), Confederate army general
- Benjamin Long (1838–1877), mayor of Dallas
- Katie Cabell Currie Muse (1861–1927), 4th President General of the United Daughters of the Confederacy
- William Stewart Simkins (1842–1929), Confederate soldier purported to have fired first shot of Civil War
- Christopher Columbus Slaughter (1837–1919), American rancher, banker and philanthropist
- J. M. Thurmond (1836–1882), attorney and mayor of Dallas
- John H. Traylor (1839–1925), politician, developer, mayor of Dallas
- Alexander White (1816–1893), US Congressman from Alabama
- Frank W. Wozencraft (1892–1966), mayor of Dallas
- Nelson Bunker Hunt (1926–2014), billionaire, horse-breeder and major financer of the John Birch Society
