= John Henry Brown =

American politician (1820–1895)

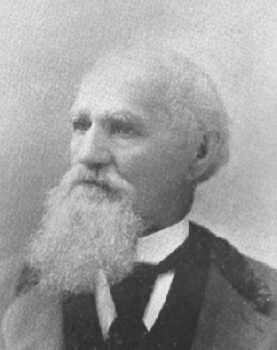
- John Henry Brown
- Born: October 29, 1820; Pike County, Missouri Territory, U.S.
- Died: May 31, 1895 (aged 74); Dallas, Texas, U.S.
- Military career
- Allegiance: Confederate States of America
- Branch: Confederate States Army
- Service years: 1861–1865
- Rank: Major
- Conflicts: American Civil War
- Other work: Journalist, Politician, Historian, Mayor of Dallas

John Henry Brown (October 29, 1820 – May 31, 1895) was an American journalist, military leader, author, politician, and historian, who served as a state legislator and as mayor of both Galveston (1856) and Dallas, Texas (1885–1887). Brown was among the first to publish scholarly histories of the state of Texas and the city of Dallas.

Since the late 20th century, Brown has been the subject of significant criticism. His writing and speeches, particularly in the antebellum years, expressed considerable racism and discrimination against African Americans, most of whom in Texas gained freedom only after the Civil War and emancipation. He also opposed abolitionists and later whites who were sympathetic to the freedmen.

== Life and career ==
John Henry Brown was born in 1820 in Pike County, Missouri Territory, the son of Henry S. Brown and Margaret Kerr (Jones) Brown. He received little formal schooling but apprenticed as a youth in a printer's office and various newspapers in Missouri. At age 17, Brown moved to the recently established Republic of Texas and soon was working for a newspaper in Austin.

His military career began in 1840 in skirmishes against Indians, and by 1841 he had attained the rank of first sergeant. He was involved in several battles in the succeeding two years.

In April 1843 Brown returned to Missouri, where in July of that year he married Marion F. Mitchel. They eventually had five children together. In 1845 the couple migrated to Texas to live. In 1846, Brown was commissioned as a major in the militia of Texas, which had joined the union as a state in December 1845. He resumed his newspaper career the same year.

In 1848, the Brown family moved to Indianola, Texas. There Brown founded a newspaper and published a number of documents on the history of Texas and the Southwest.

Brown became the associate editor of a newspaper in Galveston in 1854. He was elected that year to the Texas legislature, and in 1856 he became mayor of Galveston. He returned to the state legislature in 1857. After another term, he moved to Belton, Texas, and continued activities in both journalism and the military.

As the Civil War approached, Brown was selected in 1861 to chair the committee that prepared Texas's articles of secession. Beginning service in the Confederate States Army as a private, he rose to the rank of major, serving on the staff of Brig. Gen. Benjamin McCulloch, then as assistant adjutant general on the staff of Gen. Henry E. McCulloch. Because of health issues, Brown returned to Texas in 1863; he served the remainder of the war in the Texas militia.

Brown was displeased with the Union's victory. Like numerous other Confederates, he moved with his family to Mexico in June 1865, where they lived until 1871. They returned to the U.S. and settled in Dallas. In 1872 Brown was elected again to the Texas state legislature. He continued to be politically active, holding numerous state and local appointments and offices. Most notably he served as Dallas's mayor from 1885 to 1887.

From 1880 until his death in 1895, Brown wrote and edited several books on the history of the region, including The History of Dallas County, 1837-1887, The Life and Times of Henry Smith, Indian Wars and Pioneers of Texas, and The History of Texas from 1685 to 1892.

Brown died in Dallas at the age of 74. He was buried at Greenwood Cemetery in Dallas.

== Legacy ==
A newspaper report of Brown's funeral recorded that the procession "was one of the longest ever seen in Dallas"; another one four years later said Brown "had a state-wide reputation and probably knew more persons in Texas than any other one man." Brown's papers are preserved in the Texas Hall of State in Dallas's Fair Park.

A number of places or institutions were named for him: Brown Street, in Dallas's Oak Lawn neighborhood; and John Henry Brown School, an elementary school opened in 1912 in South Dallas.

During the 1950s the demographics of the school's neighborhood changed from early generations of European Americans and Jewish immigrants; it became primarily African-American. In 1955, Brown Elementary School was the focus of Dallas's first desegregation-related legal action, as an African-American family sued for the right of their children to attend the segregated whites-only school that was half a block from their home; the suit was dismissed. In succeeding decades, desegregation did occur and was ordered by federal courts in the 1970s.

Meanwhile, community resentment grew as local residents learned about Brown's racist rhetoric, as illustrated in these excerpts from Michael Phillips, White Metropolis: Race, Ethnicity, and Religion in Dallas, 1841-2001 (2006):

- "'[A]malgamation of the white with the black race, inevitably leads to disease, decline and death,' Galveston State Representative and later Dallas mayor John Henry Brown warned in 1857."
- "In December 1857 Brown proposed a joint resolution calling for resumption of the African slave trade that had been prohibited by the U.S. Constitution since 1808. Brown argued that the Negro was 'indisputably adapted by nature, to the condition of servitude' and, rescued from the savagery and disease of Africa by the white man, enjoyed 'a degree of health unequalled' by slaves anywhere else in the world."
- "'[A] free negro population is a curse to any people,' John Henry Brown warned in a state House committee hearing in 1857. Free blacks and mixed-blood persons had been allowed to remain in Texas, Brown said, due to white 'humanity and generosity.'"
- "Brown advised slaveowners to 'whip no abolitionist, drive off no abolitionist—hang them, or let them alone.'"

While Brown's racist writing may have been typical of opinions of antebellum white slaveholders, local Dallas residents objected to their children having to attend a school that honored such a man. In 1999, the Dallas school board authorized changing the name to Billy E. Dade Elementary School (Dade was an African-American public-school educator in Dallas). As of 2006, the Dade school was renamed for use as the Billy E. Dade Middle Learning Center.

Preceded by William Lewis Cabell	Mayor of Dallas; 1885–1887	Succeeded by Winship C. Connor
Preceded by unknown	Member of the Texas House of Representatives; 1854–1856	Succeeded by unknown
Preceded by unknown	Member of the Texas House of Representatives; 1857–1858	Succeeded by unknown
Preceded by unknown	Member of the Texas House of Representatives; 1872–1875	Succeeded by unknown
