= J. M. Thurmond =

American politician (1836–1882)

17th Mayor of Dallas
- In office 1879–1880
- Preceded by: William Lewis Cabell
- Succeeded by: J. J. Good

Personal details
- Born: February 22, 1836 Daviess County, Kentucky
- Died: March 14, 1882 (aged 46) Dallas, Texas
- Resting place: Greenwood Cemetery; Dallas, Texas
- Spouse: Amanda J. Bentley
- Children: James M. Thurmond Jr.
- Occupation: Lawyer, Judge

Military service
- Allegiance: Union
- Branch/service: Co E 4 Kentucky Cavalry
- Rank: Private

James M. Thurmond (February 22, 1836 – March 14, 1882), was an American attorney who served as mayor of Dallas, Texas in 1879–1880.

== Biography ==
James Madison Thurmond was born February 22, 1836, in Daviess County, Kentucky, to Philip Thurmond and Rebecca Ann Snead. He married Amanda J. Bentley on February 14, 1880, in Dallas, Texas. They had one son, James M. Thurmond Jr.

Little is known of Thurmond’s childhood or formal education; he grew up on his parents’ farm and was one of ten children. And while no confirmable record of Civil War service, for either side, is available, his father owned enslaved people, and his brother Israel Snead Thurmond was in the Confederate Army.

Regardless of any military activity, in 1863, Thurmond moved to the Idaho Territory and set up a law practice in Virginia City (now part of Montana). During the December 1864 trial for the first stage robbery in Idaho Territory, Thurmond was part of the defense counsel for George Ives, one of the men guilty of the crime. The Vigilante Committee of Virginia City, the ersatz law enforcement of the area, took umbrage against Thurmond for his representation of Ives. After the trial, the Committee hanged Ives then banished Thurmond from the Territory. The Idaho World reported, “The Vigilantes were highly incensed and notified him to quit the country within fifteen minutes. Thurmond replied that if his mule wouldn’t buck, he didn’t want but five!”

Thurmond moved to Salt Lake City in the Utah Territory and opened a law practice in the Oriental Hotel. Once settled, he filed a lawsuit against Jeremiah M. Fox, a leader of the Vigilante Committee, alleging that, because of Fox, Thurmond sustained loss of property, health, earnings, and respect in the Idaho Territory. The suit was for $10,000, and Thurmond eventually received $3214.28.

Outside his law practice, Thurmond participated in the first established Masonic lodge meeting, which occurred on November 11, 1865. They elected officers and began the steps for securing a Masonic charter in Utah. The minutes show Thurmond as being chosen as secretary. This lodge ultimately became Mt. Moriah No. 2 F&AM of Utah.

On a less positive note, while no one was harmed, in October 1868, Thurmond found himself in a knife- and pistol-involved argument that would replay itself similarly in Texas on more than one occasion.

Thurmond moved to Bryan, Texas, in early 1869, for unrecorded reasons. In April of that year, Texas Governor E. J. Davis appointed Thurmond, an avowed republican, both mayor of Bryan, Texas, and county judge of Brazos County. In March 1870, he resigned from his mayoral duties to become District Attorney of the Third Judicial District. The following month, he spoke at a meeting of the Republican Party for the Seventeenth Senatorial District of Texas at which the party members “hail[ed] with joy the adoption of the Fifteenth Amendment” of the United States and that rejoining the Union “meets our cordial approval.” At this same meeting, he was elected Chair of a committee for the Seventeenth Senatorial District. The day after this selection, he again showed his other side, violently taking his cane to fellow Radical and State House Representative Charles W. Gardiner, “because Gardiner had been `shooting off his mouth' about Thurmond’s affairs.”

Soon after, as judge for the Thirty-first District, Thurmond ran afoul of Governor Davis. Davis allegedly possessed a signed resignation letter from Thurmond that Davis could date and officially accept at his (the governor’s) pleasure.

Thurmond, however, denied the existence of such a document in a letter to Davis which was publicly read on the Senate floor in February 1871. Thurmond claimed that he had authored an undated resignation letter for his appointment as judge of the Thirty-First District expecting that it would be exchanged for a nomination and confirmation to a new district. Thurmond stated that he gave the resignation to Texas Senator Phidello W. Hall and requested that Hall give the document to the governor at the appropriate time.

Governor Davis, uncertain as to the legal vacancy of Thurmond’s Thirty-first District, requested that the Senate Judicial committee investigate. This committee reported to Governor Davis that Thurmond’s words related to the purpose of the resignation letter rang false. Their report states that

About the time of the appointment of Judge Thurmond to the Thirty-first District, certain charges affecting his integrity had been made to the Governor, and, although these charges were denied and explained in writing by Thurmond, a doubt existed with the Governor as to the propriety of appointing him, whereupon Thurmond agreed to deposit, and did deposit, in the hands of Senator Hall, an unconditional written resignation which was to be delivered to the Governor by Senator Hall whenever his Excellency, becoming satisfied that Thurmond lacked the integrity necessary to fill a high judicial position, saw proper to demand it.

The charges against Thurmond’s integrity were unnamed, and the episode ultimately resulted in Thurmond’s removal from the judgeship.

Thurmond moved to Corsicana, Texas, to take over The Corsicana Independent, its first issue coming out on January 1, 1872. His proprietorship came to a quick end; a mere five months later, the Dallas Weekly Herald states that the Independent’s name was changed to the Navarro Banner and that Thurmond was retiring and moving to Dallas.

Resuming his law practice, Thurmond was a well-known attorney, willing to take up high-profile cases. In the 1874 trial of the lynching of Reuben “Rube” Johnson, The State of Texas vs. Marion Dill, William Bell and Elija Rice, Thurmond defended the accused men. In his three-hour closing argument, Thurmond disparaged the local press for alleged biased reporting, and though the defendants were judged guilty, the public still praised Thurmond for his command of the case.

In April 1879, he was elected mayor from a field of candidates that included W. L. Cabell, W. C. Holland, E. C. McClure, and Thurmond. He served with the following aldermen: (Ward 1) John B. Stone, J. F. Caldwell; (Ward 2) L. F. Bohny and J.S. Ballard; (Ward 3) W. K. Wheelock and J. S. Witwer; and (Ward 4) C. E. Keller and W. R. McEntire. Wanting to further Dallas’ reputation as a safe, profitable, and well-maintained city, the Council passed ordinances related to public health, drunkenness, gaming, vagrancy, assault and battery, and disturbing the peace. Other ordinances of this council included building and maintaining both sidewalks and the water and gas supply.

At the time of his mayoralty, the city elected a new mayor every year, and he was re-elected in April 1880. The second term was fraught with difficulties, and in July, the aldermen of the city voted to remove him from office over three abuse-of-power charges. The first charge was that, while mayor, Thurmond defended a man named Goldsby who was accused of using vulgar language in a saloon. During the trial, Thurmond allegedly made defamatory statements about the Dallas police force, commenting that the officers must be acting in concert with the saloon’s owner and stepping aside as illegal activities occurred.

Secondly, Thurmond was said to have received a horse in lieu of a fee while also knowing that the horse was stolen. When Officer W. H. Smith confronted Thurmond with the information on the horse, the mayor declared he had already sold the animal and refused to identify the buyer. The horse was discovered near Richardson, Texas, with the buyer showing receipts for the forty-five-dollar sale of the horse. Thurmond refunded the money when the horse was delivered to its proper owner in Wise County. At issue, however, was not only Thurmond’s unwillingness to provide Smith with the name of the buyer but also Thurmond’s offer of ten dollars to Smith if the matter was dropped. Smith and others felt this money was offered as a bribe.

Finally, the mayor was accused of fining gamblers only one dollar for gaming when the city ordinance stated that ten dollars was the amount of the fine. Thurmond pled ignorance about knowing the amount; however, as the gaming ordinance was enacted by him, the investigators met his claim with skepticism.

In the council chambers on July 16, 1880, in front of a large crowd, Aldermen Henry S. Ervay, Zimri Hunt, and E. M. Tillman delivered the findings of their investigation to the other aldermen. Mayor Thurmond opened the meeting then retired from the chamber as he was “the object of the charges.” The committee declared it found no solid evidence of a bribery attempt relating to the horse; nonetheless, it judged Thurmond to be undignified in his disparaging comments while in court and refused to support Thurmond’s statements about the gambling fine.

Alderman Hunt moved to accept the report with no action. Alderman Tillman then proclaimed the Council’s “entire want of confidence” in Thurmond and declared the position vacant, citing the body’s prerogative to do so via Section 19 of the City Charter, which states that the City Council “shall have power to remove any officer . . . for any neglect, misdemeanor or malfeasance in office.”

Dallas held an election for a new mayor only weeks later. Thurmond ran for this election, but John J. Good was elected. During the brief campaign period, Thurmond asserted that not only had official papers been forged against him but also that without the input of the citizenry, he had been unconstitutionally removed from office.

After the election, he did not pursue those allegations and continued his general law practice. On March 14, 1882, Thurmond died in a Dallas courtroom at the hand of lawyer Robert E. Cowart. Cowart was one of the prosecutors in charge of forcing him out of City Hall, and bad blood had existed between the two men since 1880. The cause of this final altercation was not known, but it was possibly related to both the mayoral investigation and Thurmond’s belief that Cowart had slandered Thurmond’s name. Thurmond produced a weapon first, but Cowart shot first and killed Thurmond. Immediately arrested then bailed for $200, Cowart was convicted of murder and sentenced to seven years in prison. Upon appeal, he was acquitted with self-defense noted as the reason for the shooting

Thurmond, interred at Greenwood Cemetery in Dallas, Texas, was a man of many sides, as multiple newspapers, books, and first-hand accounts described him. Called a carpet-bagger, a “true and unswerving Republican”, a loyal friend, a convicted liar, an honorable man, a scoundrel, and “a brilliant fellow . . . but a bulldozer, reckless in the extreme” who had nothing “in the nature of what the world calls moral principles,” Thurmond made an impact wherever he called home.
