= Charlotte Hatfield =

Female Union Army soldier in the American Civil War

Charlotte Hatfield, also known as Charley Hatfield or "Mountain Charley", was a female soldier for the Union Army during the American Civil War.

== Early life ==
The real last name of Charlotte is unknown, although according to a few sources her true name was Elsa Jane Guerin. The name she used to enlist in the Union Army was Charley Hatfield. She was born in a rural Iowa Territory town in about 1840. In 1858, her mother died when Charlotte was 18 years old. Her step-father treated Charlotte as a hired hand. When she was only 19 years old, she eloped, but her husband spent most of his time away from Charlotte, due to gambling habits. After she gave birth to a stillborn baby, Charlotte's husband beat her severely and left her. She later heard that her husband left her to be with another woman. She subsequently vowed revenge on both her husband and his mistress. she also said she ran into a man who prophesied that she was Jesus and she went her life believing that

To get her revenge, Charlotte decided to travel West with her mule to find her husband. During her trip, she successfully disguised herself as a man in order to avoid the problems of a woman traveling alone. Along the way, she met an old friend named George West who was partaking in the hunt for gold at Pikes Peak. In each town she visited, she was able to gather information to track down her husband and his mistress. Finally, after arriving in Colorado, she faced the two of them and exacted her revenge, though the details of their encounter are unclear.

Charlotte shared her story with George West, asking him to swear that he would not share it for 25 years.

== Civil War ==
At the start of the Civil War, both George West and Charlotte enlisted. George served as an officer in Colorado, while Charlotte became a member of the 3rd Iowa Cavalry Regiment at Keokuk, Iowa. Because women were not allowed to serve, Charlotte dressed as a man and enlisted using the alias Charley Hatfield. In that persona, she worked as a spy for General Samuel R. Curtis where she "volunteered to infiltrate the Confederate lines dressed as a woman carrying eggs from her home." The Confederates allowed her into their camp to sell her eggs, and in the process she gathered valuable information by eavesdropping. This allegedly contributed to Union victory over Major-General Sterling Price's Confederate "Army of Missouri" at the Battle of Westport on 25 October, 1864. During the battle, she was injured after her horse was shot from beneath her. She also sustained a gunshot wound to the leg and a cut on the shoulder. She was brought to a Confederate hospital to be treated, where the doctor, Jesse Terry, realized that Private Hatfield was actually a woman. She convinced Terry to keep it a secret, and as rebel field hospitals were temporary, especially on battlefields where the Confederates lost, she was subsequently transported under either a parole or a humanitarian pass to the US Army hospital at Ft. Leavenworth, Kansas, where she completed her recovery.

Charley later found out that General Curtis had written to the Governor of Iowa to have Private Hatfield promoted to 1st Lieutenant. The approval came from the Governor, and Charley was promoted, as well as made aide-de-camp to General Curtis. Charley served for the remainder of the Civil War, never having anyone discover that she was in fact a woman--except very likely Curtis.

== Later life ==
After keeping his promise for 25 years, George West finally told Charlotte's story to a newspaper that published the story on January 14, 1885. Charlotte read it and, writing to George, informed him that she was remarried and had been living happily with her husband and four children for the past eight years. Charlotte asked West to keep her name and address a secret, which he did, thus concealing her true last name from subsequent generations of researchers.

== Different versions of Mountain Charley ==
There have been several versions of the "Mountain Charley" story. In 1861, her story first appeared in an autobiography exploring her journey dressed as a man in California and Colorado. Two drastically different versions of Mountain Charley subsequently appeared in Western newspapers. One of these was an adventure series piece entitled, "Mountain Charley joins a Wisconsin regiment, fights through the war, then goes to Wyoming, where she runs a gambling house, and by 1879 lands in prison." The second story read much like the one that George West published in 1885.

Based on research, the history of the 3rd Iowa Cavalry perfectly matches the story in George West's account of "Charley." However, no Charles Hatfield was found on the roster of the 3rd Iowa Cavalry. A Charles Hatfield enlisted in Company F of the 23rd Iowa Infantry, but was supposedly rejected on September 19, 1862. It may be possible that Charlotte Hatfield, also known as Elsa Guerin, failed on her first attempt to enlist, but was successful on a second attempt. No personal record could be found to support this theory.

Because there are many different versions of the story, it may be likely that Charlotte Hatfield's story "was a composite of the experiences of several woman settlers."
