= Calvary M. Young =

American Civil War soldier (1840–1909)

Calvary Morris Young
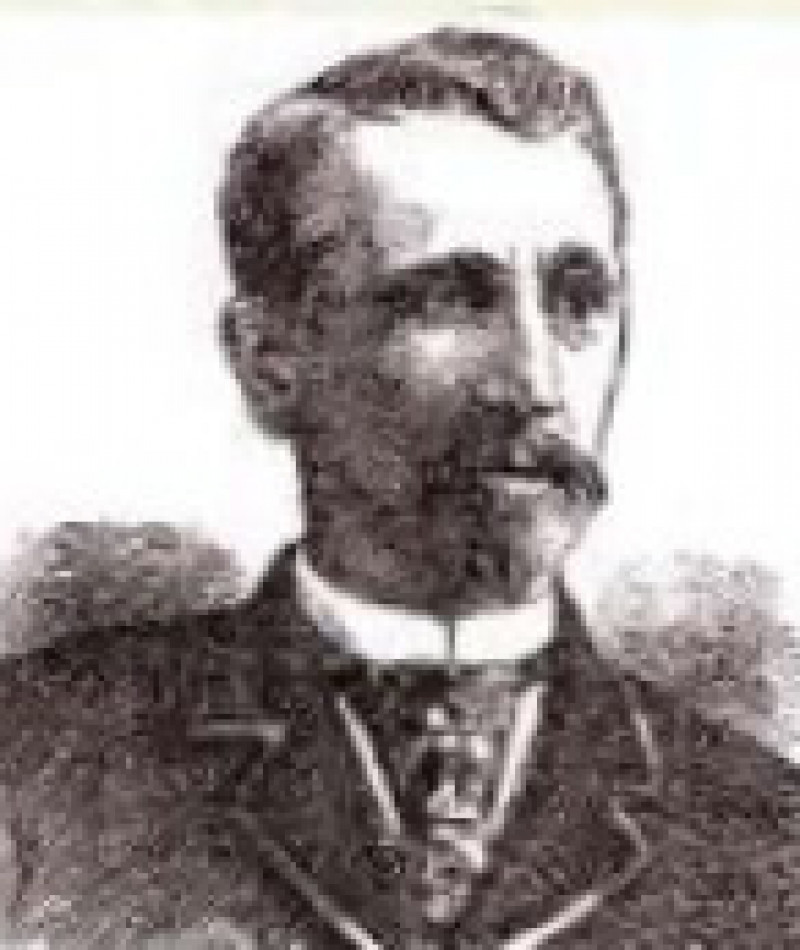
- Born: March 12, 1840; Washington County, Ohio
- Died: July 11, 1909 (aged 69)
- Burial place: Fort Mitchell, Kentucky
- Military career
- Allegiance: United States of America
- Branch: Union Army
- Rank: Sergeant
- Units: Company L, 3rd Iowa Cavalry
- Conflicts: American Civil War: Price's Raid
- Awards: Medal of Honor

Calvary Morris Young (March 12, 1840 – July 11, 1909) was an American soldier who fought in the American Civil War. Young received his country's highest award for bravery during combat, the Medal of Honor. Young's medal was awarded for his gallantry during the capture of the Confederate States Army Brigadier General William Lewis Cabell during Price's Raid in Kansas at the Battle of Mine Creek on October 25, 1864. He was honored with the award on April 4, 1865.

Young was born in Washington County, Ohio, and entered service in Hopeville, Iowa. He was buried in Fort Mitchell, Kentucky.

== See also ==
- List of American Civil War Medal of Honor recipients: T–Z
