= William Lewis Cabell =

14th, 16th and 20th mayor of Dallas

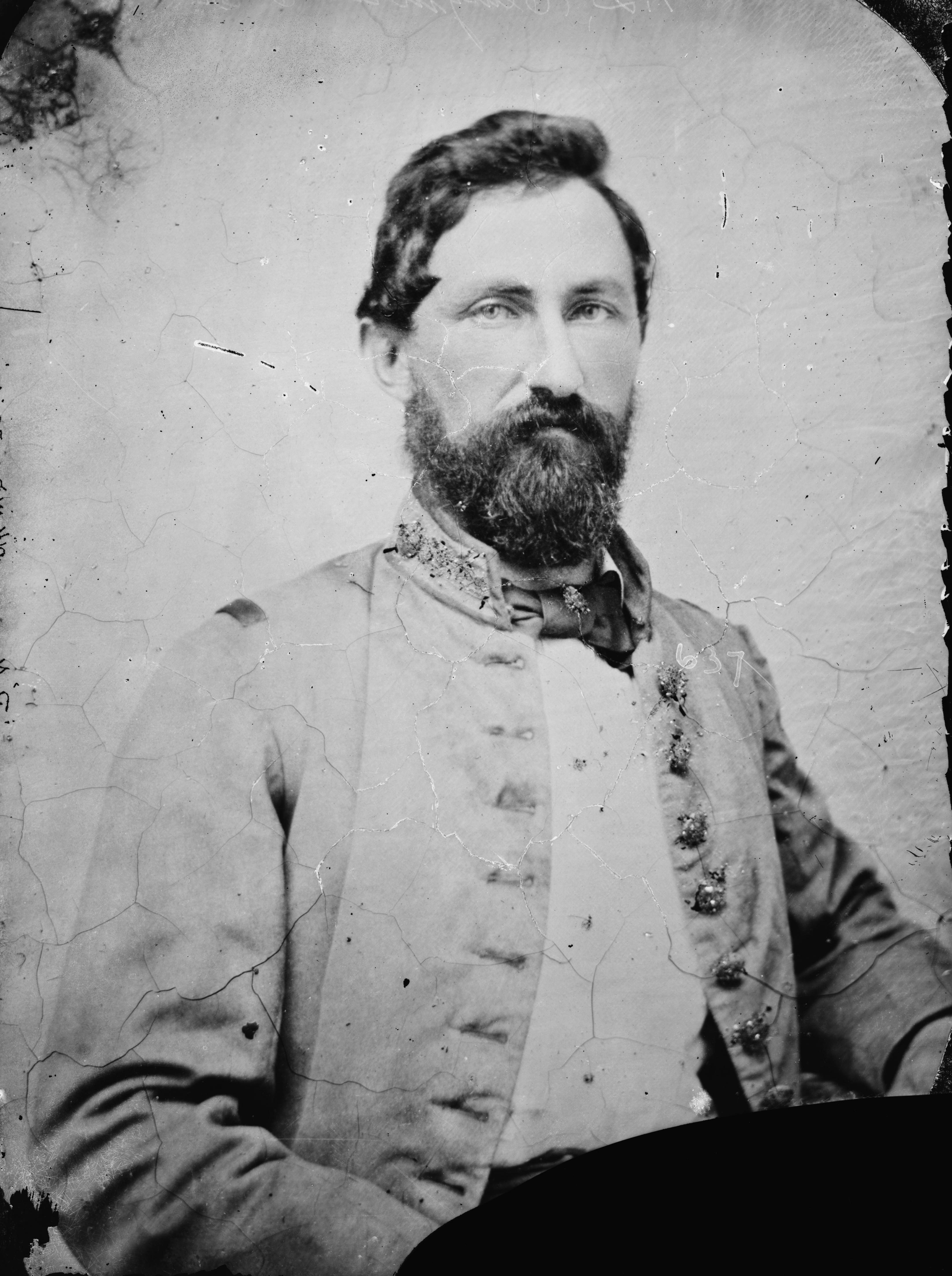
- Cabell in uniform, c. 1862

14th, 16th and 20th Mayor of Dallas
- In office 1874–1876
- Preceded by: Benjamin Long
- Succeeded by: John D. Kerfoot
- In office 1877–1879
- Preceded by: John D. Kerfoot
- Succeeded by: James M. Thurmond
- In office 1883–1885
- Preceded by: John W. Crowdus
- Succeeded by: John H. Brown

Personal details
- Born: January 1, 1827 Danville, Virginia, U.S.
- Died: February 22, 1911 (aged 84) Dallas, Texas, U.S.
- Resting place: Greenwood Cemetery, Dallas, Texas, U.S. 32°48′03.6″N 96°47′53.3″W
- Party: Democratic
- Spouse: Harriet A. Rector (m. 1856)
- Relations: Katie Cabell Currie Muse (daughter); Ben E. Cabell (son); Charles P. Cabell (grandson); Earle Cabell (grandson)
- Nickname: "Old Tige"

Military service
- Allegiance: United States; Confederate States
- Branch/service: United States Army; Confederate States Army
- Years of service: 1850–1861 (USA); 1861–1865 (CSA)
- Rank: First Lieutenant (USA); Brigadier General (CSA)
- Battles/wars: American Civil War: Battle of Iuka; Second Battle of Corinth; Battle of Hatchie's Bridge; Battle of Fayetteville; Battle of Devil's Backbone; Camden Expedition; Battle of Poison Spring; Battle of Marks' Mills; Price's Missouri Expedition; Battle of Mine Creek (POW)

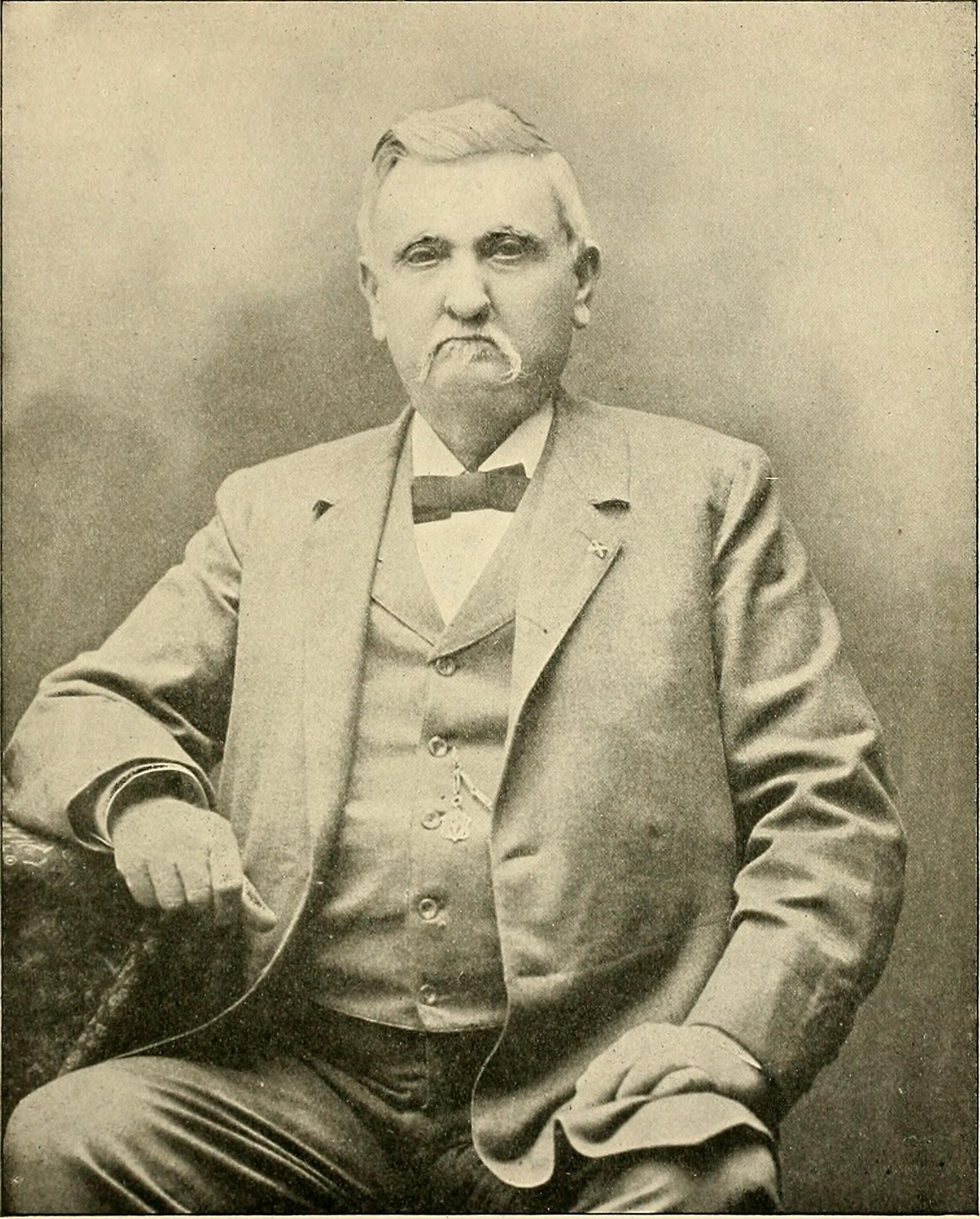
Cabell in his older years

William Lewis Cabell (January 1, 1827 – February 21, 1911) was an American engineer, lawyer, businessman, and politician who served as the 14th, 16th and 20th mayor of Dallas (1874–1876, 1877–1879 and 1883–1885). Prior to that, he was a senior officer of the Confederate States Army who commanded infantry in the Western and Trans-Mississippi theaters of the American Civil War.

== Early life and education ==
William Lewis Cabell was born in Danville, Virginia. Cabell had seven brothers. Six of them held prominent positions in the Confederate States Army. Another brother died just prior to the American Civil War from an arrow wound received in Florida. Cabell graduated from the United States Military Academy at West Point in 1850 and joined the United States Army as a second lieutenant with the 7th U.S. Infantry. In June 1855, he was promoted to first lieutenant and appointed as regimental quartermaster on the staff of General Persifor F. Smith.

== American Civil War ==
At the outbreak of the American Civil War, Cabell returned to Little Rock, Arkansas, and offered his services to Arkansas Governor Rector. In April 1861, he received a telegram from the Confederate States government and went to Richmond, Virginia, to assist in the establishment of the commissary, quartermaster, and ordnance departments for the Confederate military. He was sent to Manassas, Virginia, to take the position of Quartermaster for the Confederate Army of the Potomac under General P.G.T. Beauregard. He served on Beauregard's staff and then on the staff of General Joseph E. Johnston until reassigned in January 1862.

After leaving Virginia, Cabell was assigned by General Albert Sidney Johnston to serve under Major-General Earl Van Dorn, who was commander of the Trans-Mississippi Department. Cabell was promoted to brigadier-general and placed in command of all Confederate troops on the White River, with his headquarters at Jacksonport, Arkansas. Soon after the Battle of Pea Ridge, Confederate forces were withdrawn from Arkansas and moved across the Mississippi River. Upon his arrival at Corinth, Mississippi, Cabell was given command of a Texas brigade with an Arkansas regiment attached. Cabell led this brigade in several engagements around Corinth. Cabell was transferred to an Arkansas brigade, which he led in the Battle of Iuka and the Battle of Corinth. He was wounded leading a charge against the Union entrenchments at Corinth and again at the Battle of Hatchie's Bridge, which left him temporarily disabled and unfit for field command.

In February 1863, he was placed in command of northwestern Arkansas and successfully recruited and outfitted one of the largest cavalry brigades west of the Mississippi. Cabell led this brigade in over 20 engagements in the Trans-Mississippi Department including prominent roles at the Battle of Poison Spring and the Battle of Marks' Mills where he commanded two brigades under Brigadier-General James Fleming Fagan. He commanded Confederate forces in the Battle of Fayetteville, on April 18, 1863. Cabell was captured in Kansas (by Sergeant Calvary M. Young of the 3rd Iowa Cavalry) during Price's Missouri Expedition on October 25, 1864, at the Battle of Mine Creek and was held as a prisoner of war at the Johnson's Island camp on Lake Erie and then at Fort Warren in Boston.

== Later years ==
After the war, Cabell returned to Fort Smith, Arkansas, where he worked as a civil engineer and studied law at night. He was admitted to the Arkansas bar in 1868 and practiced law for a few years. In 1872, Cabell and his family moved to Dallas, Texas. In 1874, he was elected mayor of that city and served three two-year terms: in 1874–1876, in 1877–1879, and finally in 1883–1885. During his tenure, he expanded rail access to the city, established sewer and electrical services, started a program of paving streets, and presided over a period of rapid growth. After leaving office, Cabell became Vice President of the Texas Trunk Railroad Company. In 1885, he was appointed as U.S. Marshal and served in that capacity until 1889. During the Spanish–American War, at age 71, he offered his military services to the U.S. Government.

Cabell also remained active in Confederate veteran affairs. He oversaw several large veteran reunions and assisted in establishing pensions, veteran homes, and Confederate cemeteries in Texas. He served as commander of the Trans-Mississippi Department of the United Confederate Veterans. William Lewis Cabell died in Dallas on February 22, 1911. 50,000 people lined the streets for a military parade and 25,000 witnessed the ceremony of his burial at Greenwood Cemetery. Before his death, Cabell had converted to Catholicism.

== Personal life ==
Cabell married the daughter of Major Elias Rector of Arkansas; she served as a nurse during the Civil War. Daughter Katie Doswell Cabell, who married a Mr. Currie, followed by Mr. Muse, became president after the war of the Texas Division, United Daughters of the Confederacy (UDC) (25 May 1896 – 17 Dec 1897 & 17 Oct 1921 – 19 Oct 1922) and President General, UDC (serving Nov 1897 – Nov 1899). Grandson Charles P. Cabell had a career in the United States Air Force, gaining rank as a four-star general. He was appointed as Deputy Director of Central Intelligence during the 1950s. Another grandson, Earle Cabell, became a politician and was also elected as mayor of Dallas. He was serving in November 1963 when United States President John F. Kennedy was assassinated there.

== See also ==
- List of Confederate States Army generals
- List of commanders-in-chief of the United Confederate Veterans
