= James Postell Douglas =

American politician (1836–1901)

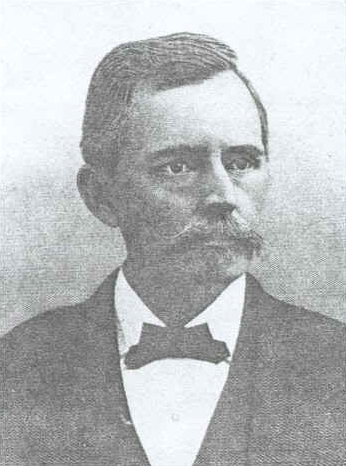
James Postell Douglas

James Postell Douglas (January 7, 1836, in Lancaster, South Carolina – November 27, 1901, in Texas) was a soldier, politician, and businessman in the state of Texas. He is regarded as the founder of the Cotton Belt Route, a major railroad system connecting Texas and Arkansas north to St. Louis, Missouri.

Douglas' parents Alexander and Margaret Douglas moved their family from South Carolina to Talladega, Alabama in 1838 and then to Texas in 1847, settling in Tyler in 1848. After his father died in 1854, Douglas supported the family by working as a school principal while reading law. In 1859 he purchased half-ownership in the Tyler Reporter newspaper (now the Tyler Courier-Times) and became its editor.

After the Civil War broke out, Douglas helped raise a battery of artillery and became a first lieutenant. The only battery of Texas artillery to serve east of the Mississippi River, the First Texas Battery saw action throughout the war. Douglas was promoted to captain in July 1862. The battery was paroled in May 1865 in Mobile, Alabama and Douglas returned to Texas.

Douglas returned to being a newspaper editor. In 1870 he was elected to the Texas Senate, where he was a strong opponent of Reconstruction.

== Railroad ventures ==
Douglas owned farms and canneries around Tyler (as well as possibly the first peach orchard in East Texas) and was interested in finding better outlets for his produce. Douglas petitioned the Texas legislature for a railroad charter in 1870, and the legislature granted one at the end of 1871. After many difficulties in raising sufficient funds in Reconstruction Texas, construction finally began in 1875 and the railroad began operation in 1877. This was the Tyler Tap, basis of the later Cotton Belt Route.

Douglas was still unable to pay off his investors, and so he organized a new venture with businessmen from St. Louis, the Texas and St. Louis. The Texas and St. Louis was to extend the Tyler Tap to Texarkana to connect more directly to eastern markets. Douglas served as the first president of the Texas and St. Louis from 1879 to 1880, before becoming involved with a different railroad scheme.

In 1880 Douglas became the first president of the Texas and Gulf Short Line Railroad, which proposed to connect Tyler to Sabine Pass on the Gulf of Mexico. The company shortened the task by purchasing an existing horsecar line which had track running to Rusk, Texas. Douglas remained president until 1883, at which point the railroad had 61 miles of track.

All three railroads came under the control of Jay Gould around 1890 and were organized into the Cotton Belt Route or St. Louis Southwestern Railroad.

In 1889 Douglas and some associates organized a smaller scale enterprise - the Tyler Street Railroad Company. By 1891 the company had about 3 miles of track and 4 mule-drawn cars. The line apparently shut down in 1894, perhaps a victim of the Panic of 1893.

== Family and legacy ==
Douglas married twice. He married his first wife, Sallie Susan White, on March 24, 1864; she died August 22, 1872. They had four children together. He married his second wife Alice Earle Smith on July 7, 1874, and they had six children. She survived him by many years, dying June 28, 1955. In 1952 she was presented with a special 75 year service pin by the president of the Cotton Belt Route, in memory of her husband's part in the founding of the line.

The Tyler branch of the Sons of Confederate Veterans is named in his honor, as is the Douglas Elementary School in Tyler.
