= 3rd Iowa Cavalry Regiment =

Cavalry regiment that served in the Union Army during the American Civil War

- Iowa state flag
- Active: August 30, 1861, to August 9, 1865
- Country: United States
- Allegiance: Union
- Branch: Cavalry
- Engagements: Battle of Pea Ridge; Siege of Vicksburg; Battle of Brice's Crossroads; Battle of Mine Creek; Battle of Egypt Station; Battle of Columbus

The 3rd Iowa Cavalry Regiment was a cavalry regiment that served in the Union Army during the American Civil War.

== Service ==
The 3rd Iowa Cavalry was organized at Keokuk, Iowa and mustered in for three years of Federal service between August 30, 1861, and September 14, 1861.

The regiment was mustered out of Federal service on August 9, 1865.

== Total strength and casualties ==
A total of 2,165 men served in the 3rd Iowa at one time or another during its existence. It suffered 5 officers and 79 enlisted men who were killed in action or who died of their wounds and 4 officers and 230 enlisted men who died of disease, for a total of 318 fatalities.

== Commanders ==
- Colonel Cyrus Bussey
- Colonel Henry C. Caldwell
- Colonel John Willock Noble

== Other Notable People ==
- Charlotte Hatfield, who may have served with the 3rd Iowa Cavalry under an assumed name.
- John Pickler, United States Representative from South Dakota.
- Calvary M. Young, who captured a Confederate brigadier general in 1864, during Price's Raid into Missouri and Kansas.

== See also ==
- List of Iowa Civil War Units
- Iowa in the American Civil War
