= John Jay Good =

American judge

18th Mayor of Dallas
- In office 1880–1881
- Preceded by: J. M. Thurmond
- Succeeded by: J. W. Crowdus

Personal details
- Born: July 12, 1827 Columbus, Mississippi
- Died: September 17, 1882 (aged 55) El Paso, Texas
- Resting place: Pioneer Cemetery
- Party: Democratic
- Spouse: Susan Anna Floyd

Military service
- Allegiance: Confederate States Army
- Rank: Captain

John Jay Good (July 12, 1827 – September 17, 1882) was a Texan judge, soldier, and mayor of the city of Dallas.

== Biography ==
John Jay Good was born July 12, 1827, in Monroe County, Mississippi to George Good. He married Susan Anna Floyd, daughter of Nathaniel Crosby Floyd and Susan Umpstead Hart, on July 25, 1854, in Dallas, Texas. They had eight children: John Jay Good Jr., George, Ben McCullough, Bettie H., Nathaniel Stanley, Frances Sue, Cerelle, and Willie Good.

He attended Cumberland University, and studied law in Columbus, Mississippi. He was admitted to the bar in 1849 and practice law in Pikesville, Marion County, Alabama. He left Alabama with the idea to engage in the Mexican embargo war, but finding that the war was ill-advised, he returned to Dallas through which he had passed on the way to Austin. He arrived in Dallas November 25, 1851. There he settled and became involved with the interests of the community, including the plans of John H. Reagan to support navigation of the Trinity River.

At the beginning of the Civil War, he formed a local militia group and later joined Capt. Douglas Company, Texas Artillery. After the war, he was elected a judge for the 16th Judicial District, but was removed by Phil Sheridan. He became mayor of Dallas in 1880.

He was a member of the Masonic Lodge, the Knights Templar, and the Independent Order of Odd Fellows. The Dallas Fire Department was organized in 1871 which elected officers each year. In 1878, John J. Good was president of the Fire Department.

J. J. Good died September 17, 1882, in El Paso, Texas. He had been traveling to better climates in hopes being restored to better health when he died. He was interred at the Odd Fellows Cemetery (now Pioneer Park).
