= Earle Cabell =

American politician (1906–1975)

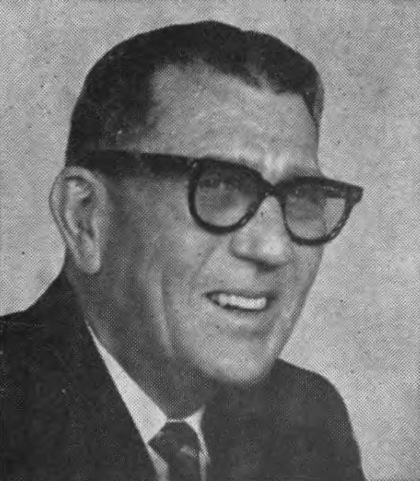

Member of the U.S. House of Representatives from Texas's 5th district
- In office January 3, 1965 – January 3, 1973
- Preceded by: Bruce Reynolds Alger
- Succeeded by: Alan Steelman

48th Mayor of Dallas
- In office May 1, 1961 – February 3, 1964
- Preceded by: Robert L. Thornton
- Succeeded by: J. Erik Jonsson

Personal details
- Born: October 27, 1906 Dallas County, Texas, U.S.
- Died: September 24, 1975 (aged 68) Dallas, Texas, U.S.
- Party: Democratic
- Spouse: Elizabeth “Dearie” Holder (m. 1932)
- Children: 2
- Parent(s): Ben E. Cabell; Sadie E. Pearre
- Relatives: William L. Cabell (grandfather); Charles P. Cabell (brother)
- Education: Texas A&M University; Southern Methodist University
- Occupation: Politician

Earle Cabell (October 27, 1906 – September 24, 1975) was an American politician who served as the 48th mayor of Dallas from 1961 to 1964. Cabell was mayor at the time of the assassination of United States President John F. Kennedy and was later a member of the U.S. House of Representatives. He was a conservative Democrat.

== Early life ==
Cabell was born in Dallas. He graduated from North Dallas High School in 1925. He attended Texas A&M University for one term, where he met Jack Crichton and H.R. "Bum" Bright, and thereafter Southern Methodist University for one term.

He and his brothers founded Cabell's Inc., a chain of dairies and convenience stores. He was Executive Vice-President and later President of the company at the time it was sold to Southland Corporation. He also served as Vice-President of the Dallas chapter of the Texas Manufacturers Association, and possessed membership of the Dallas Sales Executive Club and the Dallas Crime Commission.

Cabell was a member of the Dallas Crusade for Freedom. He attended the founding of the Dallas chapter of the John Birch Society.

=== Family ===
Cabell was the youngest of four sons of the then former Dallas Mayor Ben E. Cabell and also the grandson of the former Dallas Mayor and Confederate General William L. Cabell. He was the brother of Charles Cabell, who was deputy director of the Central Intelligence Agency from 1953 to 1962.

== Mayor of Dallas ==
In his campaign for mayor Cabell ran on a virulently anti-communist platform. He condemned proposals for slum clearance and urban redevelopment in Dallas as "the most socialistic measure to be passed onto the citizens of Dallas". Cabell's focus on these issues was a factor in his election victory in 1961. When elected he appeared on WFAA-TV to introduce the documentary Communist Encirclement produced by George S. Benson's "National Education Program". Cabell was a supporter of anti-communist General Edwin Walker, who he declared an honorary citizen of Dallas and presented with a cowboy hat during an event at the Memorial Auditorium.

In October 1961 President Kennedy flew to Dallas but when he arrived at the airport he was greeted only by the Dallas chief of police. Cabell claimed he was too busy to meet Kennedy and the White House was reportedly "steaming over the official brush-off".

=== Assassination of President Kennedy ===
Cabell and his wife met United States President John F. Kennedy and Mrs. Kennedy at Love Field on the morning of November 22, 1963. Cabell's wife reported that while riding in Kennedy's motorcade through Dealey Plaza, she observed "a rather long looking thing" sticking out of a window of the Texas School Book Depository immediately after the first shot. After receiving word from the Federal Bureau of Investigation that he was the subject of a death threat, Cabell was guarded by police when he traveled to Washington, D.C. to attend Kennedy's funeral and also upon his return to Dallas.

Cabell defended the Dallas PD after Oswald was killed by Jack Ruby in their custody. He said that he was proud of the police force and that those critical of their conduct were only looking for "someone else to blame". He added that "they have performed admirable under the most difficult of circumstances".

In 1999 documents published by the Assassination Records Review Board disclosed that President Kennedy's original coffin, which had been damaged on route from Dallas to Washington, had been dumped in the Atlantic Ocean at a depth of 9,000 feet. According to these documents this occurred at the suggestion of Cabell, who said that he felt that the casket had "value for the morbidly curious. And I believe that I am correct in stating that this morbid curiosity is that which we all seek to stop".

One version of John F. Kennedy assassination conspiracy theories, the "Renegade CIA Clique" theory, implicates Cabell and other alleged conspirators, including CIA officials James Jesus Angleton, William King Harvey, and Cabell's brother Charles Cabell, who had been fired by Kennedy following the Bay of Pigs Invasion. This theory claims that Earle Cabell re-routed Kennedy's motorcade (which then passed closer to the Book Depository) as a favor to his brother.

In 2017, documents declassified under the JFK Records Act revealed that Cabell had been a CIA asset since 1956.

== Congress ==
On February 3, 1964, Cabell resigned as mayor of Dallas in order to run for Congress. He unseated the ten-year Republican incumbent Bruce Alger. Cabell served four terms in the House before he was defeated by Republican Alan Steelman in the 1972 election. Cabell voted in favor of the Voting Rights Act of 1965 and the Civil Rights Act of 1968. Although he did oppose desegregation busing, in 1971 he and Congressman Ray Roberts introduced a constitutional amendment to prevent any public school student from being required to attend a particular school as part of the busing program.

Cabell was a strident supporter of the Vietnam War. He condemned the draft resistance movement, which he said had a practice of deliberately committing crimes like robbery, burglary, and assault, alongside falsely claiming to be homosexual, in order to receive a dishonourable discharge. This was "Communist-inspired" according to Cabell. He described the Fulbright hearings held by the Senate Committee on Foreign Relations in order to evaluate U.S. policy on Vietnam as a "witch-hunt" and a disservice to the United States.

When George McGovern was chosen as the Democratic nominee for the 1972 U.S. presidential election, Cabell distanced himself from his fellow Democrat. He at least partially attributed his failure to be re-elected in 1972 to McGovern: "He was poison in this area! I denounced him immediately. Sincerely, I thought he was a menace".

== Later life ==
Following his defeat, he retired in Dallas, where he lived until his death in 1975 from emphysema. He was buried at Restland Cemetery in Dallas.

== Legacy ==
The Earle Cabell Federal Building and Courthouse on Commerce Street in Dallas is named in his honor.

Political offices
Preceded by Robert L. Thornton	Mayor of Dallas; 1961–1964	Succeeded by Erik Jonsson
U.S. House of Representatives
Preceded by Bruce Reynolds Alger (R)	United States Representative for the 5th Congressional District of Texas; 1965–1973	Succeeded by Alan Watson Steelman (R)
