= Charles P. Cabell =

United States Air Force general (1903–1971)

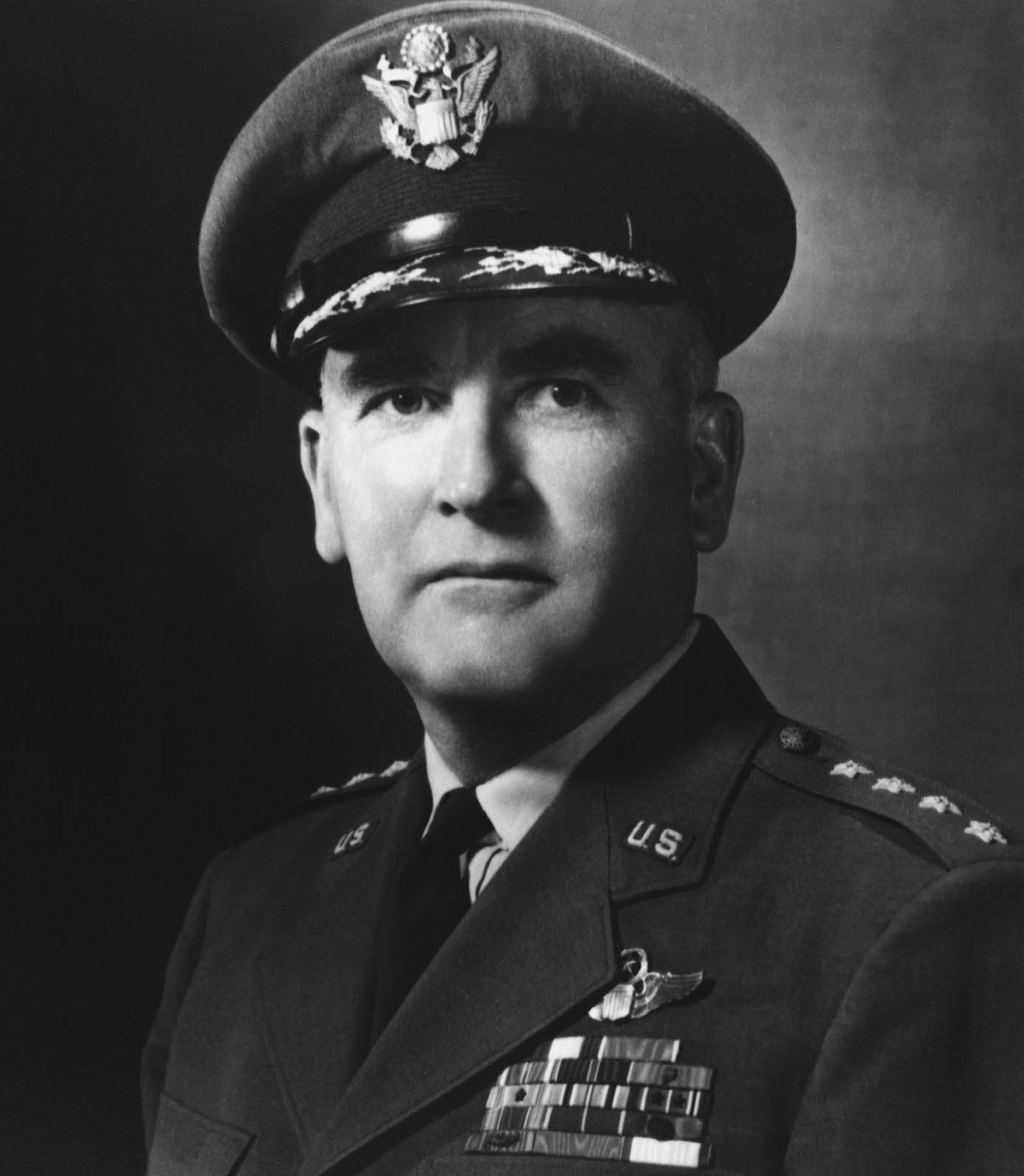
- General Charles P. Cabell
- Born: Charles Pearre Cabell; October 11, 1903; Dallas, Texas, U.S.
- Died: May 25, 1971 (aged 67); Arlington, Virginia, U.S.
- Burial place: Arlington National Cemetery
- Spouse: Jacklyn DeHymel
- Relatives: Ben E. Cabell (father); William L. Cabell (grandfather); Earle Cabell (brother)
- Military career
- Allegiance: United States of America
- Branch: United States Air Force
- Service years: 1925–1962
- Rank: General
- Conflicts: World War II; Cold War
- Awards: Distinguished Service Medal (2); Legion of Merit; Distinguished Flying Cross; Bronze Star; Air Medal (2)

Charles Pearre Cabell (October 11, 1903 – May 25, 1971) was a United States Air Force general and Deputy Director of the Central Intelligence Agency (1953–1962).

== Early life ==
Charles P. Cabell was born in Dallas, Texas on October 11, 1903, the son of Ben E. (son of Confederate general William L. Cabell) and Sadie E. (Pearre) Cabell. He attended Oak Cliff High School in Dallas, Texas, and graduated from West Point in 1925. He was initially commissioned as an artillery lieutenant and served in the field artillery until 1931, when he went to flying school, and was transferred to the Air Corps.

== Military career ==
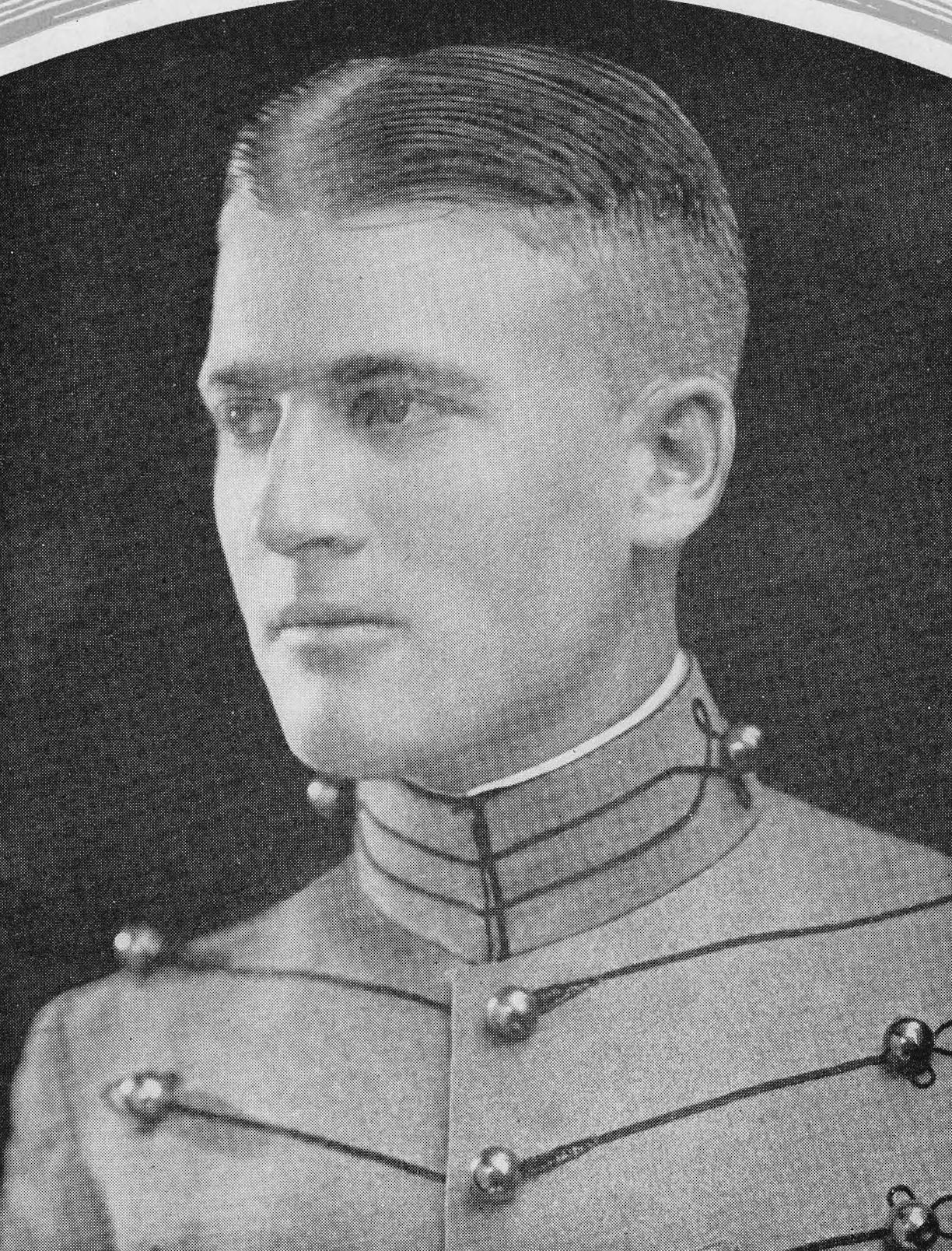
At West Point in 1925

He served in a variety of aviation roles as a staff officer and squadron commander throughout the pre-war years, primarily in observation and pursuit squadrons. He was transferred to the Panama Canal Zone in late 1931 as adjutant of the 7th Observation Squadron, and subsequently commanded 44th Observation, 24th Pursuit, and 74th Pursuit Squadrons in this area. He was promoted to captain sometime during this period.

He was transferred to Randolph Field, Texas, as flight instructor in 1934 and subsequently served as post adjutant, beginning in 1937. He was detailed to Air Corps Tactical School at Maxwell Field, Alabama in 1938, graduating in 1939, then detailed to Command and General Staff College at Leavenworth, Kansas, in 1939, graduating in 1940. He was promoted to major sometime during this period. He was assigned to the Photographic unit at Wright Field, Ohio during 1940, and as an observer with the Royal Air Force; in April 1941, he was assigned to the Office of the Chief of the Air Corps as chief of the photographic unit. He was promoted to lieutenant colonel sometime during this period.

In February 1942, Cabell was assigned as assistant executive for technical planning and coordination in the Office of the Chief of the Air Corps, and promoted to colonel. During the summer of 1943, he attended the first course of the Army and Navy Staff College. In late 1943, he was transferred to the Eighth Air Force and assumed command of the 45th Combat Bombardment Wing. In April 1944, he became director of plans for the U.S. Strategic Air Force in Europe, and later that year, having achieved the rank of brigadier general, became director of operations and intelligence for the Mediterranean Air Forces. During the war he served both at air force headquarters at the Pentagon and in the European Theater.

In May 1945, he was assigned to Air Force headquarters as chief of the Strategy and Policy Division. In December 1945, he was detailed to the United Nations Military Staff Committee, where he held roles as deputy and chief U.S. Air Force delegate to the committee. In August 1947, he was promoted major general and returned to Air Force headquarters, serving in planning and intelligence roles, and became director of Air Force Intelligence in May 1948. In 1949, Cabell set up Project Grudge to "make a study reviewing the UFO situation for AF HQ." However, Grudge quickly became all but moribund, while simultaneously reporting that all UFO cases were being closely investigated. When Cabell learned of this, he ordered Grudge dissolved and ordered that the "open minded" Project Blue Book be created.

He held this director of Air Force Intelligence post until 1951, before being made director of the staff for the Joint Chiefs of Staff from November 1951 to 1953. During this time, he was promoted to lieutenant general. In 1952, he was an enthusiastic promoter of the U-2 spy plane, along with Allen Welsh Dulles and John Foster Dulles.

== CIA career ==
On April 23, 1953, while still an active air force officer, he was appointed Deputy Director of the CIA under Allen Dulles. In 1956, along with the CIA's Richard Bissell, he flew to Bonn, to brief the West German Chancellor, Konrad Adenauer, on the ultra-secret U-2 spy plane. Cabell personally negotiated with Chancellor Adenauer for permission to station the U-2 in Wiesbaden and from there to fly over the Soviet Union in violation of air space rights.

Cabell was promoted to full general in 1958 and retired from active duty effective January 31, 1962.

Cabell was forced to resign as deputy director by President Kennedy on January 31, 1962, following the failure of the Bay of Pigs Invasion. Cabell's brother, Earle Cabell, was Mayor of Dallas when Kennedy visited that city and was assassinated, on November 22, 1963.

== JFK assassination ==
One hypothesis regarding the assassination of U.S. President John F. Kennedy implicates Cabell and several other CIA officials, including James Jesus Angleton and William King Harvey, as well as the "three tramps", and Cabell's brother Earle Cabell.

During Jim Garrison's 1973 bribery trial, of which he was later acquitted, tape recordings from March 1971 revealed that Garrison considered publicly implicating Cabell of conspiracy in the assassination after learning he was the brother of the Dallas mayor. Theorizing that a plot to kill the President was masterminded out of New Orleans in conjunction with the CIA with cooperation from the Dallas police department and city government, Garrison tasked his chief investigator, Pershing Gervais, of looking into the possibility that Cabell had stayed in the city's Fontainebleau Motel at the time of the assassination. The Washington Post reported that there was no evidence that Gervais ever followed through with the request and that there was no further mention of Cabell in Garrison's investigation.

== Personal life ==
Cabell was married to Jacklyn DeHymel in 1934; they had two sons, Charles P. Cabell, Jr. and Benjamin Cabell IV, and one daughter, Catharine C. Bennett. He left an autobiography, A Man of Intelligence: Memoirs of War, Peace and the CIA, published in 1997. His oldest son Charles was also an Air Force officer and West Point graduate (Class of 1958), achieving the rank of brigadier general.

He was a tenth-generation descendant of Pocahontas and a third cousin of Navy four-star admiral Richard H. Jackson.

Cabell died at the Fort Myer Clinic in Arlington, Virginia after a heart attack on May 25, 1971.

== Effective dates of promotions ==
Rank	Date
Second Lieutenant	June 12, 1925
First Lieutenant	November 8, 1930
Captain	August 26, 1935
Major	June 28, 1940
Lieutenant Colonel	December 5, 1941
Colonel	April 27, 1942
Brigadier General	March 9, 1944
Major General	February 19, 1948
Lieutenant General	July 5, 1952
General	July 11, 1958

== Decorations and medals ==
- Air Force Distinguished Service Medal with oak leaf cluster
- Legion of Merit
- Distinguished Flying Cross
- Bronze Star
- Air Medal with oak leaf cluster
- American Defense Service Medal
- American Campaign Medal
- European-African-Middle Eastern Campaign Medal
- World War II Victory Medal
- National Defense Service Medal

=== Foreign awards ===
- Order of the British Empire (Honorary Commander)
- National Order of the Legion of Honor, Degree of Chevalier (France)
- Croix de Guerre with Palm (France)
- Commander, Order of Saints Maurice and Lazarus (Italy)
