= List of Dallas Independent School District schools =

This is the list of schools of the Dallas Independent School District. For more information on the district, see the main article: Dallas Independent School District.

== High Schools ==
The following are some of the senior high schools located within the district. Schools are located in the city of Dallas unless otherwise stated. Classifications are based on their football classes for the 2022-23 alignment by the University Interscholastic League, a state entity for academic and athletic competition among public schools. For football, schools are ranked into one of six "classes," based on enrollment, with 6A representing the largest schools and 1A the smallest.

=== 6A ===
- Skyline High School (1970)

=== 5A ===
==== Division 1 (D1) ====
- Moisés E. Molina High School (1997)
- W. T. White High School (1964)
- Bryan Adams High School (1957)
- Sunset High School (1925)

==== D2 ====
- W. H. Adamson High School (1915)
- Emmett J. Conrad High School (2006)
- Thomas Jefferson High School (1956)
- Justin F. Kimball High School (1958)
- W. W. Samuell High School (1957)
- Seagoville High School (1928)
- South Oak Cliff High School (1952)
- H. Grady Spruce High School (1963)
- Hillcrest High School (1938)
- Woodrow Wilson High School (1928)

=== 4A ===
==== D1 ====
- David W. Carter High School (1966)
- L. G. Pinkston High School (1964)
- North Dallas High School (1922)
- Wilmer-Hutchins High School (1928)

==== D2 ====
- Lincoln High School (1939)
- Franklin D. Roosevelt High School (1963)

=== 3A ===
- James Madison High School (1956)

=== Other ===
- CityLab High School
- Yvonne A. Ewell Townview Magnet Center
  - School for the Talented & Gifted
  - School of Education and Social Services
  - Judge Barefoot Sanders Law Magnet
  - School of Health Professions
  - School of Science and Engineering
  - The School of Business and Management
- Kathlyn Joy Gilliam Collegiate Academy
- Dr. Wright L. Lassiter Jr. Early College High School
- North Lake Early College High School (Irving, outside of the DISD boundaries but operated by DISD)
- Barack Obama Male Leadership Academy (6-12)
- Irma Lerma Rangel Young Women's Leadership School (6-12)
- New Tech High School at B. F. Darrell (formerly A. Maceo Smith New Tech High School)
- Trini Garza Early College High School
- Booker T. Washington High School for the Performing and Visual Arts
- Maya Angelou High School
- Innovation, Design, Entrepreneurship Academy at James W. Fannin
- Dr. Frederick D. Haynes III Global Preparatory Academy at Paul Quinn College

== K-8 schools ==
List of Dallas ISD K-8 schools
Name	City	Notes
George Bannerman Dealey Montessori Academy	Dallas	The school selects students on the basis of academic ability. Eric Nicholson of the Dallas Observer described its acceptance rate as being low like that of Harvard University. It is named after George Bannerman Dealey.
Dallas Hybrid Preparatory at Stephen J. Hay	Dallas	The schools serves students from 3rd-8th grade and operates on a model where each week, students attend the school in person for two days and go to school from home for three days, which is remote learning.
Downtown Montessori at Ida B. Wells Academy	Dallas	The schools serves students from Kindergarten-7th grade
Dr. Elba and Domingo Garcia West Dallas STEM School	Dallas	The school is a collaborative effort between Dallas Independent School District (ISD), Southern Methodist University (SMU), and Toyota USA Foundation. It represents a significant investment in STEM education for the West Dallas community, aiming to provide students with advanced learning opportunities and prepare them for future careers in science, technology, engineering, and mathematics.
Eduardo Mata Montessori School	Dallas	The school selects students based on their residence in the district instead of by academics: With students in the Mount Auburn Elementary zone having first priority, Woodrow Wilson High zone students having second priority, and other students after that. Neighborhoods with priority for Mata Montessori include Greenland Hills ("M Streets"), Junius Heights, and Lakewood. Mata was a neighborhood elementary school, Eduardo Mata Elementary School, serving grades 4 through 6, upon its 1997 opening. Its initial enrollment was 600, but it declined down to more than 200 students in 2013, since in 2007 6th graders were reassigned to J. L. Long Middle and Lipscomb Elementary School began taking 4th grade students the following year. In 2014 it was converted into a Montessori choice school.
Rosemont Upper and Lower School	Dallas	Rosemont School is located in North Oak Cliff. It has two parts, the Lower – Chris V. Semos Building for grades pre-kindergarten through 2 and the Upper School for grades 3 through 5. It opened in 1922 as Rosemont Elementary School, with the current lower school opening in 2005. It gained its middle school in 2012. In 2015 of The Dallas Morning News wrote that it had "strong academics, passionate students and devoted parents" and that it "is considered a neighborhood gem in North Oak Cliff". There are high income White American families in North Oak Cliff who send their children to Rosemont due to the magnet program; overall 66% of the students as of 2018 were classified as low income. The parents stated that principal Anna Brining had worked to make the school strong; in 2015 DISD notified Brining that her contract will not be renewed. The Rosemont Early Childhood Parent-Teacher Association or RECPTA is focused on fundraising for Rosemont; originally known as the Rosemont Preschool Association, it as of 2010 was the oldest parent-teacher association of an early childhood program as it was first established in 1926. In the local area the nickname for the group is the "Mommy Mafia". RECPTA holds an auction party each year, with about $30,000 netted per session. In 2018 the organization had tension between the board, which wished to use funds to benefit other schools, and the membership, which wanted the board to solely focus on Rosemont.
J.P. Starks Math, Science and Technology Vanguard	Dallas	
Solar Preparatory School for Girls at James B. Bonham	Dallas	It is located in East Dallas, across from Vickery Place. In 2016 the Bonham elementary campus was repurposed as an all-girls elementary and middle school devoted to STEAM.
Harry Stone Montessori School	Dallas	The school selects students on the basis of academic ability. Nicholson described its acceptance rate as being low like that of Harvard University.
The Medical District BioMedical School	Dallas	The school Offers a STEM program based on biomedical science & is located on the ut southwestern campus
Walnut Hill International Leadership Academy	Dallas	Formerly Walnut Hill Elementary School
William B. Travis Academy/Vanguard for the Academically Talented and Gifted	Dallas	The school serves 4th-8th grade

== Middle schools ==
List of Dallas ISD middle schools
Name	City	Notes
William Hawley Atwell Middle School	Dallas	
Young Women's STEAM Academy at Balch Springs Middle School	Balch Springs	Young Women's STEAM Academy at Balch Springs Middle School is in Balch Springs. It, as Balch Springs Middle School, was scheduled to open in 2012, and was originally coeducational. It was repurposed in 2016 as a zoned girls' school. Dallas ISD and Parkland Balch Springs Youth & Family Health Center is on a site next to the school building, on the school property. It serves disadvantaged children who do not have primary care physicians. Previously the center was known as the Spruce Youth and Family Health Center and housed on the grounds of H. Grady Spruce High. On June 3, 2013, it moved to its current location and changed its name.
Judge Louis A. Bedford, Jr. Law Academy	Dallas	
T.W. Browne Middle School	Dallas	
E.B. Comstock Middle School	Dallas	
Billy Earl Dade Middle School	Dallas	Billy Earl Dade Middle School is in the Fair Park area in South Dallas. The school merged with Pearl C. Anderson Middle School, and opened in a new $36 million building in August 2013. In 2015 Nicholson stated that the combination of the two hostile student populations and poor administration from DISD's central office caused it to become, for a period, "Dallas' Worst Public School".
Dallas Environmental Science Academy (DESA)	Dallas	As of 2020 it had about 461 students. Prior to 2018 plans were drawn up for a new building, but several DISD board members opposed this on the grounds that the neighborhood schools around it needed renovation or replacement and that only focusing on the magnet school would anger local residents.
Young Men's Leadership Academy at Fred Florence Middle School	Dallas	Young Men's Leadership Academy at Fred Florence Middle School is in Pleasant Grove. It was previously Fred F. Florence Middle School, a coeducational middle school which had about 850 students in 2016. That year it became a boys' zoned school.
Benjamin Franklin International Exploratory Academy	Dallas	The school serves: portions of the Preston Hollow area, including the "Estate area", as well as the Janmar area, and a portion of Addison. It is named after Benjamin Franklin.
Hector P. Garcia Middle School	Dallas	It was built in 2007.
W. H. Gaston Middle School	Dallas	
W. E. Greiner Exploratory Arts Academy	Dallas	
Dr. Frederick D. Haynes III Global Prep Academy at Paul Quinn College	Dallas	
Robert T. Hill Middle School	Dallas	
John Lewis Social Justice Academy at Oliver W. Holmes	Dallas	It opened in 2025 and was formerly Oliver W. Holmes Middle
Zan Wesley Holmes Jr. Middle School	Dallas	Zan Wesley Holmes Jr. Middle School is located in Oak Cliff, and also serves a section of Cockrell Hill. It was scheduled to open in 2012. Its namesake, who advocated for area public schools, is a pastor.
D.A. Hulcy STEAM Middle School	Dallas	D.A. Hulcy STEAM Middle School - Students are selected on the basis of geographic location. It opened in 2015.
Ignite Middle School	Dallas	
Kennedy-Curry Middle School	Dallas	Kennedy-Curry Middle School is in South Dallas, and serves, in addition to sections of Dallas, Wilmer, almost all of Hutchins, and a small section of Lancaster. It opened in fall 1968 as a part of the Wilmer-Hutchins Independent School District (WHISD). It closed in 2005 due to the closure of WHISD. Dallas ISD, which took over the WHISD schools, had renovated Kennedy-Curry and expanded it by almost 60,000 square feet (5,600 m^{2}). Funds from the 2008 $1.35 billion bond were used to overhaul the Wilmer-Hutchins schools. In 2011 DISD re-opened Kennedy Curry. Its namesakes are John F. Kennedy and Bishop College president Milton K. Curry.
Harold W. Lang Middle School	Dallas	
J. L. Long Middle School	Dallas	Neighborhoods within the attendance boundary include: Greenland Hills (M Streets), Junius Heights, Lakewood, Lower Greenville, Munger Place, almost all of Swiss Avenue, and Vickery Place. The school in 2015 was over capacity, with its usage at 127%. In 2011 the school stopped allowing students to carry backpacks due to the fact that it lost security guards as a result of DISD budget cuts.
Henry W. Longfellow Career Exploration Academy	Dallas	
Thomas C. Marsh Middle School	Dallas	Marsh serves, in addition to sections of Dallas, portions of Farmers Branch in DISD. By 2015 a "personalized learning" program was established there.
Francisco "Pancho" Medrano Middle School	Dallas	The school uses a geothermal cooling system instead of a regular HVAC system. It was established as part of a 2008 bond.
Piedmont G.L.O.B.A.L. Academy	Dallas	Piedmont G.L.O.B.A.L. Academy (formerly John B. Hood Middle School) - In 2012 it had a capacity of about 1,430 students but an enrollment of 1,441. That year it was relieved by the opening of Richards Middle.
Raúl Quintanilla Middle School	Dallas	The school, in addition to sections of Dallas, serves sections of Cockrell Hill. It was named after the Greater Dallas Hispanic Chamber of Commerce chairperson and a NationsBank senior vice president. The capacity was 1,200.
Ann Richards Middle School	Dallas	Ann Richards Middle School is in Pleasant Grove. Scheduled to open in 2012, it relieved John B. Hood Middle (now Piedmont Academy). It is named after former Governor of Texas Ann Richards.
Thomas J. Rusk Middle School	Dallas	Rusk serves, in addition to sections of Dallas, a portion of Highland Park.
Seagoville Middle School	Dallas	Seagoville Middle School is in Dallas, and serves most of Seagoville and the Dallas County portion of Combine.
Alex W. Spence Talented/Gifted Academy	Dallas	Downtown Dallas (inside the loop) is within the Spence attendance zone.
L. V. Stockard Middle School	Dallas	The school, in addition to sections of Dallas, serves sections of Cockrell Hill.
Boude Storey Middle School	Dallas	
Dr. Frederick Douglass Todd Sr. Middle School	Dallas	
Sam Tasby Middle School	Dallas	Sam Tasby Middle School is in Vickery Meadow, and it, with Jack Lowe Elementary, share a single campus and several common areas; the two schools have their designated entrances in the school building. Tasby opened in August 2006. Tasby, built with $20 million, relieved Franklin Middle School. The lot which Tasby and Lowe occupied used to be The Villas at Vickery, a retail and residential complex built in 1976.
Ewell D. Walker Middle School	Dallas	Walker serves: portions of the Preston Hollow area, and portions of Addison and Carrollton.
Royce West Leadership Academy	Dallas	
West Dallas Junior High	Dallas	

== Elementary schools ==
- John Q. Adams Elementary School
- Nathan Adams Elementary School
- Birdie Alexander Elementary School
- Gabe P. Allen New Tech Academy
- William Anderson Elementary School
- Arcadia Park Elementary School
- Arlington Park Early Childhood Center
- Bayles Elementary School
- Mary McLeod Bethune Elementary School
- Bishop Arts STEAM Academy
- Albert C. Black, Jr. STEAM Academy
- William A. Blair Elementary School
- Annie Webb Blanton Elementary School
- Felix G. Botello Elementary School
- James Bowie Elementary School
- Jimmie Tyler Brashear Elementary School
- John Neely Bryan Elementary School
- Harrell Budd Elementary School
- Rufus C. Burleson Elementary School
- David G. Burnet Elementary School. In 2021, 98% of the students are considered economically disadvantaged.
- George H. W. Bush Elementary School is in Addison. The Town of Addison asked Dallas ISD to build Bush with environmentally sensitive materials. The PreK-5 school was built as part of a bond approved in May 2008. Bush is adjacent to the Greenhill School and is located along Addison's trail system; therefore the school will be accessible by bicycle or on foot from the Les Lacs and Midway Meadows subdivisions. Bush has a first floor with 60,000 square feet (5,600 m^{2}) of space and a second floor with 30,000 square feet (2,800 m^{2}) of space. Bush has two athletic fields located north of the playgrounds. During non-school hours Addison residents may use the fields.
- W.W. Bushman Elementary School
- F.P. Caillet Elementary School
- Adelfa Botello Callejo Elementary School is in Pleasant Grove. Scheduled to open in 2012, it relieved San Jacinto Elementary School. Its surroundings include single and multi-family housing and industrial buildings. All of the initial employees, including principal Sandra Fernandez, were reassigned to Callejo from the former Bonham Elementary School as the latter had closed. Its namesake, who did activism, worked as a lawyer.
- John W. Carpenter Elementary School
- C.F. Carr Elementary School
- Casa View Elementary School
- Cedar Crest Elementary School - Previously known as Albert Sidney Johnson Elementary School but renamed on July 1, 2018 as the former namesake was a general in the Confederate States of America (CSA).
- Central Elementary School (Seagoville)
- Chapel Hill Preparatory School (Farmers Branch) - Previously known as William L. Cabell Elementary School but renamed on July 1, 2018 as the former namesake, Mayor of Dallas William Lewis Cabell, was a general in the Confederate States of America (CSA). Its current namesake is the community of Chapel Hill.
- Cesar Chavez Learning Center - It is in proximity to Downtown Dallas and had a planned initial enrollment of 891.
- Leonides Gonzalez Cigarroa, M.D. Elementary School
- Nancy J. Cochran Elementary School
- S.S. Conner Elementary School
- Leila P. Cowart Elementary School
- Gilbert Cuellar Sr. Elementary School
- Everette L. DeGolyer Elementary School
- Lorenzo De Zavala Elementary School
- L. O. Donald Elementary School - In addition to serving sections of Dallas, it serves a part of Cockrell Hill.
- Julius Dorsey Elementary School
- Frederick Douglass Elementary School
- Paul Laurence Dunbar Learning Center is in South Dallas, near Fair Park. In 2016 it had 594 students, with 592 of them being classified as being from poor families. Eric Nicholson of the Dallas Observer wrote that "staggering" unemployment, "Broken families", and "parents with criminal records characterize the neighborhood. In the 2014-2015 school year, Texas education authorities classified it as a failing school. As part of a reform effort, the district classified Dunbar as a "community school" in 2016 in which the district would take a holistic approach in recognizing that the surroundings affects the education studentes receive.
- J.N. Ervin Elementary School
- Stephen C. Foster Elementary School
- Anne Frank Elementary School in Far North Dallas serves, in addition to sections of Dallas, portions of Addison. It opened in August 1997 as the first U.S. school to be named after Anne Frank. The first principal, Jonnice Legum Berns, was still in that position in 2010. As part of the theme, the school has multiple books about Frank, and its mascot is the scribe. As of 2010 it had 1,287 students, with 68.5% being Hispanic or Latino, 24.2% being Black, 5.1% being White, 2% being Asian, and 0.2% being American Indian. 86.3% were classified as being from poor families.
- Otto M. Fridia Elementary School
- Geneva Heights Elementary School is in Lower Greenville, and it also serves Vickery Place. It was previously known as Robert E. Lee Elementary School but renamed on July 1, 2018 as the former namesake was a general in the Confederacy. Circa 2007 the school was known for high staff retention periods to the point where a teacher who had been at the school for fewer than ten years was considered to be a newcomer. At one time enrollment was 250, but it later got a peak enrollment of almost 600. Enrollment declined by 2007 partly because some apartment complexes housing children were razed. In addition Park Lane Elementary opened, serving areas previously zoned to Lee. By 2007 the enrollment was about 250, 30% from outside of the school's attendance zone, with enrollment being about 45% of the building's capacity and with only the ground floor in use. There were 18 students per teacher. Keri Mitchell of The Advocate Lakewood/East Dallas wrote that a 2007 campaign to attract more neighborhood families "fizzled". In 2012 the enrollment was 58% of the building's capacity. It was scheduled to absorb the population of the former Bonham Elementary School later that year. Mitchell wrote that the absorption of Bonham students added "engaged families" to the school community. In addition, during the principalship of Ali Saiyed, the school added a dual language program. In 2014 Lee had 362 students, with 71% being classified as low income and with about 83% being racial and ethnic minorities. At that time few parents from the single family houses in the area sent their children to the school. DISD planned to introduce the International Baccalaureate (IB) program to attract families to the school. In 2014 Mitchell described the new principal, Bridget Ransom, as being "energetic" and a factor that could make the school more popular. 2015 Nicholson wrote that the IB program made the school more popular in the community. The district planned to retain the original building from 1931, and by 2023 the other buildings were razed so new construction could take its place. The ex-Jill Stone Elementary building served as a temporary campus.
- Tom C. Gooch Elementary School is in Dallas. It serves, in addition to sections of Dallas, portions of Farmers Branch in DISD.
- Charles A. Gill Elementary School
- Henry B. Gonzalez Personalized Learning Academy
- Tom C. Gooch Elementary School
- Frank Guzick Elementary School
- Hall Personalized Learning Academy at Oak Cliff- formerly Lenore Kirk Hall Elementary School
- Ebby Halliday Elementary School - It opened in 2011 and was named for a businessperson and real estate agent.
- N.W. Harllee Early Childhood Center
- Nathaniel Hawthorne Elementary School
- Margaret B. Henderson Elementary School
- Montessori Academy at Onesimo Hernandez
- Victor H. Hexter Elementary School
- Highland Meadows Elementary School
- Hogg New Tech Center- formerly James S. Hogg Elementary
- H.I. Holland Elementary School at Lisbon
- Lida Hooe Elementary School
- L. L. Hotchkiss Elementary School - In 1991 Dallas ISD officials proposed that Hotchkiss Elementary School reopen as a neighborhood school during the 1992-1993 school year. The Montessori program previously at Hotchkiss would be moved to Dealey Elementary School. The proposed attendance zone for Hotchkiss was a triangular area bounded by Fair Oaks Avenue, Northwest Highway, and White Rock Creek. The proposed Hotchkiss neighborhood would relieve Kramer, Pershing, Preston Hollow, and Dan D. Rogers schools. In 1992 federal judge Barefoot Sanders blocked the reopening of Hotchkiss, so school board members filed an appeal with the 5th U.S. Circuit Court of Appeals. In 1994 Hotchkiss re-opened as a neighborhood school. The school expected to receive 875 students; it actually received almost 925. The school had to use 17 portable classrooms, and two classrooms had to be converted into food storage rooms. Judy Zimny, the principal of Hotchkiss, said that most of the students came from the apartments in the Abrams Road, Northwest Highway, and Skillman Road area. The school was 42% black, 38% Hispanic, and 20% White. The school is located within what was then a mostly-White residential neighborhood, but in 1994 most of the White students to Hotchkiss were bussed in from other locations. About 100 students from other areas were voluntarily enrolled in Hotchkiss so Hotchkiss's racial demographics were more balanced.
- Sam Houston Elementary School a.k.a. Personalized Learning Preparatory at Sam Houston is in Oak Lawn, Dallas. The current Sam Houston Elementary campus was scheduled to open in the northern hemisphere fall of 1999. In 2014-2015 its student body was 95% low income; despite that it exceeded its "performance targets". Due to gentrification, Sam Houston's enrollment declined to 201 students in the 2015-2016 school year while it had 302 students in the 2011-2012 school year.
- John Ireland Elementary School
- Eddie Bernice Johnson Elementary School (Wilmer) - Opened in 2020.
- Anson Jones Elementary School - In addition to serving sections of Dallas, it serves a part of Cockrell Hill.
- Barbara Jordan Elementary School
- Jerry R. Junkins Elementary School is in Carrollton. Named after a former CEO of Texas Instruments, it opened on August 14, 2006.
- Louise Wolff Kahn Elementary School is in west Oak Cliff/South Dallas, and a businessperson is its namesake.
- Edwin J. Kiest Elementary School
- Martin Luther King Jr. Learning Center
- Kleberg Elementary School
- Obadiah Knight Elementary School
- Arthur Kramer Elementary School is in North Dallas. It serves the Janmar area. In 1989 the DISD board proposed the re-opening of Arthur Kramer Elementary School. Under the plan, portions of the attendance boundaries of Pershing, Preston Hollow, and Rogers would have been modified. In 1991 the Kramer, Pershing, and Preston Hollow schools had a combined total of 32 portable buildings to house excess students. Parents from those schools supported plans to re-open Hotchkiss Elementary School as a neighborhood school, so it could accommodate excess students.
- Richard Lagow Elementary School
- Lakewood Elementary School is in Lakewood, Dallas, first established in 1951. Its original building could accommodate approximately 500-550 students. Circa 1984 the school first started installing temporary buildings to accommodate an increased enrollment. In 2012 Eric Nicholson of the Dallas Observer stated that Lakewood Elementary had "superb" academics, citing its regular appearance as an exemplary-ranked school by the Texas Education Agency and how its test scores were far superior to DISD and state averages. In 2014 the school had 853 students with 17% classified as being low income; 76% were non-Hispanic white. As of 2016, 96% of the student body was not low-income, making it the only DISD school with 80% or more non-low income students, and it was also the school with the highest percentage of Anglo White students in the school district. In 2015 Nicholson wrote that Lakewood elementary parents are perennially opposed to changing the school's attendance zone and that they "are fiercely protective of their successful but carefully gerrymandered neighborhood" institution. In 2014 other DISD board members opposed a proposal from fellow board member Bernadette Nuttall to rezone some houses zoned to Lakewood to Mata and Mount Auburn schools. Due to overcrowding, by 2014 the Lakewood Elementary Expansion Fund (LEEF) generated $500,000 to fund an architectural plan for an expansion, and DISD proposed a "Bridge Plan" to allow for the expansion of the school. In 2013 parents began a campaign to raise $15 million for expanding Lakewood, wanting to replace its older facility and the portable buildings that housed over half of Lakewood Elementary's students.
- Sidney Lanier Expressive Arts Vanguard
- Umphrey Lee Elementary School
- William Lipscomb Elementary School is in Junius Heights. In addition to that neighborhood it also serves Munger Place and Swiss Avenue. By 2008 DISD made the school only serve grades Pre-Kindergarten through 3, with grades 4 and 5 from the Lipscomb zone assigned to Mata Elementary. By that year parents campaigned for the return of grades 4 and 5 to Lipscomb. In 2008 Lipscomb began serving the 4th grade. As of 2019 Lipscomb now serves all elementary grades.
- Jack Lowe, Sr. Elementary School is in Vickery Meadow and shares a single campus and several common areas with Tasby Middle; the two schools have their designated entrances in the school building. Lowe has 89,000 square feet (8,300 m^{2}) of space with 34 classrooms. In August 2006 Lowe Elementary, built with $12 million, opened with kindergarten–fifth grade, relieving Hexter, L.L. Hotchkiss, Kramer, Robert E. Lee, Preston Hollow, and Dan D. Rogers elementary schools.
- B.H. Macon Elementary School
- Maple Lawn Elementary School is in Dallas. Maple Lawn serves, in addition to sections of Dallas, a portion of Highland Park. As of 2020 the school had fewer than 500 students. Maple Lawn was, in a period one of 19 not named after a person, while the district had 230 schools at this point. The school, initially in the Maple Lawn Independent School District, was formed in the 1900s by a consolidation of the Cochran Chapel school and the Maple Avenue School. The name was given by a child who suggested the name as part of a contest in exchange for $1. A two storey brick building was constructed on donated land with $10,000 raised by a bond. DISD annexed MLISD in 1922.
- Marcus Leadership Academy- formerly Herbert Marcus Elementary School
- Thomas L. Marsalis Elementary School
- Eladio R. Martinez Learning Center
- José "Joe" May Elementary School - Near Lake Bachman and opened in 2012, it is named after an ex-DISD board member.
- Ronald Erwin McNair Elementary School
- Lee A. McShan, Jr. Elementary School is in Vickery Meadow. McShan, located on an 8.2-acre (33,000 m^{2}) site, includes 89,666 square feet (8,330.2 m^{2}) of space with 33 core classrooms, three special education classrooms, dedicated classrooms for art, science, and technology classes, a 400-seat auditorium, and a gymnasium. In 2005 McShan, built with $12 million as part of a 2002 bond program, opened with 737 students, from pre-Kindergarten–sixth grade; the sixth grade would be transferred to the middle school the following year.
- Esperanza "Hope" Medrano Elementary School
- Sylvia Mendez CREW Leadership Academy
- Ben Milam Elementary School - In 2018 Eva-Marie Ayala of Dallas Morning News identified it as the elementary school which covers most of Downtown Dallas. As of 2020 it serves almost all of Downtown Dallas. It opened in 1912 as the Fairland School. By 2015 gentrification was occurring in the area, which had the possibility of causing enrollment figures to decline. In 2018 many of the fewer than 300 students did not originate from its attendance zone." Ayala wrote that Milam "has limited space to grow much more if a new specialized program was offered there." In 2018 DISD designated it as one of six "decision point" schools which could be closed due to a low student population.
- William Brown Miller Elementary School
- Mockingbird Elementary School is located in Lower Greenville, and also serves Greenland Hills (the "M Streets"), and is in proximity to it. Its campus has a capacity of about 400 students. It was Previously known as Stonewall Jackson Elementary School but renamed on July 1, 2018 as the former namesake was a general in the Confederacy. Mockingbird houses Dallas ISD's deaf program for elementary school. In previous periods it had about 100 districtwide deaf students and 100 zoned families, but by 2007 the school's popularity among neighborhood parents increased. The school, as of 2005, gives American Sign Language instruction to all students. In addition most employees, including the principal and all teachers, also had knowledge of ASL. Principles and Methods of Adapted Physical Education and Recreation (2005 edition) states that the "unique and exceptional efforts in educating all children" enrolled resulted in the school receiving the Blue Ribbon Award in 1999.
- Jesus Moroles Expressive Arts Vanguard
- Maria Moreno Elementary School
- Nancy Moseley Elementary School
- Mount Auburn Elementary School a.k.a. Mount Auburn STEAM Academy - In 2015 almost all of the students were Hispanic and Latino, and most were economically disadvantaged.
- Clara Oliver Elementary School
- George Peabody Elementary School
- Elisha M. Pease Elementary School
- John F. Peeler Elementary School - In 2018 DISD designated it as one of six "decision point" schools which could be closed in the future due to a low student population.
- John J. Pershing Elementary School is in North Dallas, within Preston Hollow., and serving a part of Old Preston Hollow.
- Personalized Learning Academy at Highland Meadows
- Personalized Learning Preparatory at Sam Houston
- Pleasant Grove Elementary School
- K.B. Polk Center for Academically Talented and Gifted
- Preston Hollow Elementary School
- John H. Reagan Elementary School
- Martha Turner Reilly Elementary School
- Reinhardt Elementary School
- Joseph J. Rhoads Learning Center
- Charles Rice Learning Center, located in the Queen City area of South Dallas, is in a red brick, two story building. As part of reforms encouraged by U.S. District Judge Barefoot Sanders, DISD increased the school day length and increased teacher salaries in schools designated as "learning centers" which included Rice. In 2015 Eric Nicholson of the Dallas Observer stated that Rice is "generally regarded by parents as" the best elementary school in South Dallas. According to Nicholson, "regard Charles Rice as a local gem, but its reputation for quality doesn't extend much further than that" partly due to the school's high level of student poverty and partly due to the poor reputation of South Dallas. The school, which as of 2015 had 98% of its students designated as having free or reduced lunch (a marker of being poor), had the highest 2013-2015 School Effectiveness Index (SEI), an internal DISD school index that determines how well a school is performing relative to its community demographics. Nicholson wrote in March 2016 that the SEI ranking "perennially puts Charles Rice neck and neck with [Lakewood Elementary in the Lakewood neighborhood in East Dallas] as the district's best non-magnet school" even though Rice's raw test scores, while above the DISD average, were far below Lakewood's. As of 2015 Rice had earned three of five distinctions from the Texas Education Agency (TEA). While many low income schools have a lot of teacher turnover, Rice, as of 2016, has an average teacher tenure of 23.3 years.
- Thelma Elizabeth Page Richardson Elementary School is located in Pleasant Grove. Named after a teacher, it opened in 2013.
- Oran M. Roberts Elementary School is located in the Fair Park area. The previous campus closed in 2012 with a new campus opening in August 2013. The former school building was demolished.
- Dan D. Rogers Elementary School
- Edna Rowe Elementary School
- John W. Runyon Elementary School
- Clinton P. Russell Elementary School
- Arturo Salazar Elementary School
- Julian T. Saldivar Elementary School
- San Jacinto Elementary School is in Pleasant Grove. In 2012 it had an official capacity of 551, but it had 690 enrolled students. Callejo Elementary opened in 2012 to relieve it. REAL School Gardens, a Fort Worth company, installed a school garden circa 2015.
- Alex Sanger Preparatory School, formerly Alex Sanger Elementary School, is in Forest Hills.
  - In 2013 the majority of the students came from English as a second language and working class backgrounds. That year, the assistant city manager of Dallas had her child at Sanger but later withdrew the child, and Rudy Bush of The Dallas Morning News wrote an op-ed explaining her reasoning for doing so. According to Joe Tone of the Dallas Observer, there were multiple parents at Sanger who felt the op-ed was unfair. Tim Rogers of D Magazine also criticized the Bush story. According to Rogers, the article "did grievous damage to" DISD and to Sanger.
- School for the Talented and Gifted in Pleasant Grove
- Seagoville Elementary School is in Seagoville, and also serves the Dallas County portion of Combine.
- Seagoville North Elementary School is in Seagoville. It was scheduled to open in 2012, due to an increasing population in Seagoville.
- Ascher Silberstein Elementary School
- Larry G. Smith Elementary School
- Solar Preparatory School for Boys
- Solar Preparatory School for Girls
- Celestino Mauricio Soto Jr. Elementary School, In addition to serving sections of Dallas, it serves a part of Cockrell Hill.
- J.P. Starks Elementary School (also J. P. Starks Math, Science and Technology Vanguard) is in East Oak Cliff.
- Leslie A. Stemmons Elementary School
- Stevens Park Elementary School
- Jill Stone Elementary School at Vickery Meadow is in Vickery Midtown (formerly Vickery Meadow). Stone Elementary includes two main buildings, with one including the administrative offices, the media center, and several classrooms and the other including common areas and public function facilities, and modular classroom buildings with individual telephone and toilet facilities. The two story main Stone building has outdoor stairwells and faces an inner courtyard. Jayne Noble Suhler of The Dallas Morning News said "[i]n a neighborhood of apartments, [Stone Elementary] fits right in[...]" Vickery Meadows Elementary School opened as the first school in Vickery Meadow; in 2005 it was renamed Jill Stone Elementary School at Vickery Meadow. When it opened, Vickery Meadows Elementary took in 400 students. Previously students who were bussed to other campuses in the Dallas area were now able to walk to their zoned schools. As of 1998, all students at Vickery Meadows Elementary were immersed in completely English classes for eight weeks before being placed in bilingual or ESL classes. The district anticipated that the school would be 75% Hispanic.
- C.A. Tatum Jr. Elementary School
- Buckner Terrace Montessori
- T.G. Terry Elementary School
- H.S. Thompson Steam Academy
- Robert L. Thornton Elementary School
- Edward Titche Elementary School is in Pleasant Grove. In 2015 it was over capacity with forty portable buildings to house excess students. During that year a bond proposal included a new campus for Titche.
- Thomas Tolbert Elementary School
- Trinity Heights Talented and Gifted
- George W. Truett Elementary School
- Adelle Turner Elementary School
- Mark Twain School for the Talented and Gifted - In 2018 DISD designated it as one of six "decision point" schools which could be closed in the future due to a low student population.
- Urban Park Elementary School
  - A replacement campus began construction in 2024.
- Daniel Webster Elementary School
- Martin Weiss Elementary School
- Sudie L. Williams Talented and Gifted Academy
- Wilmer-Hutchins Elementary School is located in South Dallas and serves, in addition to sections of Dallas, almost all of Hutchins, and a small section of Lancaster. Previously it also included a portion of Wilmer. The school opened in 2011 to serve areas of the former Wilmer-Hutchins Independent School District.
- Winnetka Elementary School
- Harry C. Withers Elementary School is in North Dallas and serves a section of Preston Hollow. It has a Spanish-English dual-language programthat as of 2013 this program has a waiting list; the school has a lottery system to determine which out-of-boundary students may attend. In 1982 the school only had 80 students, so the district closed it, but after the area school-aged population increased, DISD opened the school again in 1990.
- Whitney M. Young Jr. Elementary School
- Ignacio Zaragoza Elementary School, a few buildings in Downtown Dallas are in the school's attendance boundary.

== Preschools ==
- Wilmer Early Childhood Center - Wilmer - It occupies the former Wilmer Hutchins ISD Wilmer Elementary School. It opened in 2015.

== Former schools ==
=== Former high schools ===
- Norman Robert Crozier Technical High School (the school was known by many names)
  - Dallas High School 1907–1916
  - Main High School 1916–1917
  - Bryan Street High School 1917–1928
  - Dallas Technical High School 1928–1942
  - Crozier Technical High School 1942–1971 (school closed in June 1971, next year most went to Skyline HS 7777 Forney road. Some students that came from Crozier Tech negotiated with DISD to show the diplomas as N.R. Crozier Technical High School up to the year 1975)
  - Business and Management Magnet Center 1975-May 1995 (School relocated to Townview Center May 1995)
- Pleasant Grove High School 1953–1957 (the school had been in existence since 1939 but was in Pleasant Grove ISD until that district was absorbed into Dallas ISD in 1953. Today the campus is used by John Quincy Adams Elementary School)
- Forest Avenue High School 1916–1956 (was converted from a whites-only school to an African-American school and renamed James Madison High School, and the white students were sent to Crozier Tech)
- Rylie High School 1956–1963 (converted to a junior high and replaced with H. Grady Spruce High School)
- A. Maceo Smith High School
- E. D. Walker High School for pupils with disabilities - Later instead housed an elementary school program for advanced students
- A Health Special Alternative High School, for pregnant students was Constructed named Maya Angelou School

=== Former middle schools ===
- Pearl C. Anderson Middle School (closed 2013) - The school was in South Dallas. Shortly after the closure, the school was targeted by thieves and vandals. In 2013 the Dallas County Appraisal District (DCAD) appraised the property's value as $208,100.
- Edward H. Cary Middle School was in North Dallas, and serves a section of the Preston Hollow area, including Old Preston Hollow or the "Estate area". In 2019 the school had 500 students. In 2019 a strike from a tornado destroyed the school building. In the period until a new campus building is established, Franklin Middle School was scheduled to take about 60% of the students while the remainder were to go to Medrano Middle School. It was disestablished in 2020.
- S. S. Conner Junior High School 1955–1964 (the S. S. Conner name was subsequently taken by an elementary school that opened in 1965)
- Edison Middle Learning Center (closed 2018) It was located in West Dallas and named after Thomas Edison. In 2018 it had scores in Texas state tests, considered unacceptable by the Texas Education Agency (TEA), for five consecutive years in a row. In 2018 the number of students was below half of the building's capacity; in 2015 the utilization, the smallest in the district's traditional schools, was 32%. Hobbs and Hacker stated that "Not many families choose to send their children to the habitually low-performing school." Every single student was classified as low income in the 2013-2014 school year, and by 2018 the percentage of such was 80%. The region of Dallas in which it was located was majority Hispanophone. The physical plant of the building was also deteriorating at that time. Bill Zeeble of described the last principal, Earl Gilmore, as the "last-chance principal". In an attempt to keep the school open, DISD made Edison a "Accelerating Campus Excellence" (ACE) school. However the district ultimately had the school closed in 2018; if DISD had not closed Edison that year, the State of Texas would have had the right to take action against Edison. As a result L. G. Pinkston High School expanded to grades 7-12 and absorbed the students. In 2019, Edison began housing students from Jefferson High as the school's building sustained damage from a 2019 tornado.
- D. A. Hulcy Middle School - In the Red Bird community, it closed in 2012, due to a decline in the district's budget. For a period DISD used it as a police training academy. In 2013 the DCAD appraised the value of the property at $11.1 million. It became D.A. Hulcy STEAM Middle School in 2015.
- Maynard Jackson Middle School (closed 2011) - Prior to summer 2011 the community often complained about poor conditions at the school. DISD rezoned the students to Kennedy Curry Middle School in southern Dallas.
- Rylie Junior High School 1963–1978 (converted from the former Rylie High School; later closed and became a charter school in the 1980s)
- Sequoyah Junior High School 1958–1969 (replaced by Thomas Edison Junior High School; Sequoyah was converted to an elementary campus)

=== Former primary schools ===
- Addison School (closed 1966)
- Alamo School (closed 1968)
- Arlington Park Elementary School - Closed in 2012
- Stephen F. Austin School (opened in 1886 as East Dallas School; renamed Stephen F. Austin School in 1902; served as an elementary school until 1976, when the building was taken over by the High School for the Health Professions; the structure was razed around the year 2000)
- James B. Bonham Elementary School (Closed in 2012) - It served most of Vickery Place. Bonham opened in 1923 as the Vickery Place School. Designed by C.D. Hill, the building's price was about $121,000. The school received its current name in December 1939. The Vickery Meadow Association wrote "We believe this was done to avoid confusion with the town of Vickery, which was annexed into DISD soon afterwards." Bonham Elementary won the National Excellence in Urban Education Award in 2009 and the Blue Ribbon School Award in 2010, and the Texas Education Agency (TEA) ranked the campus as exemplary for several years. The school had above 200 students in the 2011-2012 school year, leading Eric Nicholson of the Dallas Observer to write that the school was "badly underused". There were 22 students per teacher at that time, which was lower than the common ration of 27 to 1, and underpopulation was one reason stated to close the school. The student population sharply declined as neighborhood gentrification occurred, and the inflation-adjusted median income increased by 80% from 1990 to 2010. Fewer school-age children lived in the area, with 580 residents 18 or younger in 2010, compared to 1,187 in 1990. The husband of the president of the Bonham parent-teacher association, Dave Walkington, stated that the district may have additionally selected Bonham as a way of telling the Texas Legislature that it needed additional funds and that high performing schools were in jeopardy. Additionally articles from local publications stated that DISD would have reductions in federal funding if it closed campuses with poor academic performance. DISD board members stated that deciding to close a small school regardless of its academic performance would be a fair decision. Students were rezoned to Robert E. Lee Elementary School, since renamed Geneva Heights Elementary School. All of the final teaching employees, including principal Sandra Fernandez, were reassigned to Callejo Elementary, which had opened that year. The physical building, post-closure, had sustained some vandalism. After the closure DISD immigration intake facility opened on the Bonham school grounds, but not in the main building. In 2013 the DCAD appraised the property's value as $6.7 million. The Bonham campus became a female-only STEAM school in 2016.
- City Park Elementary School (Closed in 2012) - City Park Elementary School in Cedars, named for its location across Old City Park, first opened in 1919, and served the community until it closed. As of 2013 it is used as an after-school program's classroom location. In 2014 the nonprofit Vogel Alcove began leasing the school building, providing day care and preschool to homeless children.
- David Crockett School (replaced by Ignacio Zaragoza Elementary in 1990 - Currently houses special programs) - Ken Good renovated the school building after purchasing it and was selling it in 2013.
- Eagle Ford School (closed 1968)
- James W. Fannin Elementary School - Closed in 2012, due to a decline in the district's budget. After the closure, an adult basic education program was set up there.
- Frazier Elementary School - Closed in 2012 - An animal infestation occurred afterward.
- Tom W. Field Elementary School - In 2010 DISD investigated Tom W. Field Elementary and discovered that the administration forced teachers to not teach certain subjects, and made false grades to make it appear that the students took the classes. Many of the students originated from a housing complex a distance away, and a school bus transported them to Field. In 2018 the enrollment count was 224. That year DISD designated it as one of six "decision point" schools which could be closed due to a low student population. Field closed in later that year. Ayala stated that the student population could be moved to Joe May Elementary. In October 2019 the district began temporarily using the Field building to house Walnut Hill Elementary School students as their building was destroyed by a tornado.
- Harlee Elementary School - Closed in 2012
- Thomas C. Hassell School (closed 1980 and demolished to allow for roadway expansion)
- Stephen J. Hay School (closed in the late 1970s and has housed several special programs since)
- James S. Hogg Elementary School is in the north part of Oak Cliff. In 2015 the school had 280 students, with 50% of them natively speaking Spanish and with over 90% of the total being Hispanic and/or Latino. In 2016 it established a two-way English-Spanish bilingual education program, partly due to the Hispanic and Latino presence at the school.[80] In 2018 DISD designated it as one of six "decision point" schools which could be closed in the future due to a low student population
- Benito Juarez School (closed 1971)
- John F. Kennedy Learning Center - Circa 2010 the school had 648 students, but the number declined and in 2015 there were 412 students.
- Mirabeau B. Lamar School (currently houses special programs)
- Letot School (closed 1968)
- H. S. Thompson Learning Center/Elementary School (closed 2012) - The school was in South Dallas. As part of reforms encouraged by Judge Sanders, DISD increased the school day length and increased teacher salaries in schools designated as "learning centers" which included Thompson. In 1990 the school had over 900 students, and there were 2,800 residents 0-14 within a 1-mile (1.6 km) radius. From 2000 to 2010 the number of black students at H.S. Thompson Elementary School declined as the housing occupancy levels in its attendance boundary decreased and as the Rhoads Terrace housing projects and other area housing projects were closed and demolished. In 2010 the school had 220 students; half African American and half Hispanic. By 2010 the numbers of students and 0-14 area residents declined to around 200 and 1,110, respectively. In 2013 several DISD administrators suggested to the board that it could reopen H.S. Thompson, but this did not happen. By 2013 the former school was targeted by vandals. In 2013 it was one of the two school properties with the lowest assessed value by the DCAD, at $61,570. A 2016 fire occurred on the second floor of the building.
- Vickery School (closed 1971)
- Wheatland School (closed 1964)
- Phillis Wheatley Elementary School (closed 2012) - The facility is located in the Wheatley Place community in South Dallas. The post-closure facility was vandalized. In 2013 it was one of the two school properties with the lowest assessed value by the DCAD, at $69,720. In 1993 it was nominated as a Dallas historic landmark.

Grades 4–6

- Daniel 'Chappie' James Learning Center (Dallas) (closed after Spring 2006, students rezoned to Dunbar Elementary, reopened as Irma Lerma Rangel Young Women's Leadership School in 2006.
- J. Leslie Patton Elementary School (Dallas) (closed after Spring 2006, students rezoned to Oliver (became PreK–5), Russell (4–5), Bryan (PreK–5), Miller (PreK–5))

Pre-K through grade 3

- Robert C. Buckner Elementary School (Dallas)
- Fannie C. Harris Elementary School (students moved to Oran Roberts Elementary for Pre-K through 3)
- Joseph J. McMillan Elementary School (Dallas) (closed after Spring 2006, rezoned to Oliver (became PreK–5), Seguin (PK–3), Bryan (PreK–5), Miller (PreK–5))

Grades K–3

- T.D. Marshall Elementary School (Dallas) (closed after Spring 2006, most of it was rezoned to Oliver (became PreK–5) and small portions were rezoned to Lisbon (PreK–5), Seguin (PK–3))
