= Peak's Suburban Addition, Dallas =

Neighborhood in Dallas, Texas, USA

Peak's Suburban Addition
- Neighborhood
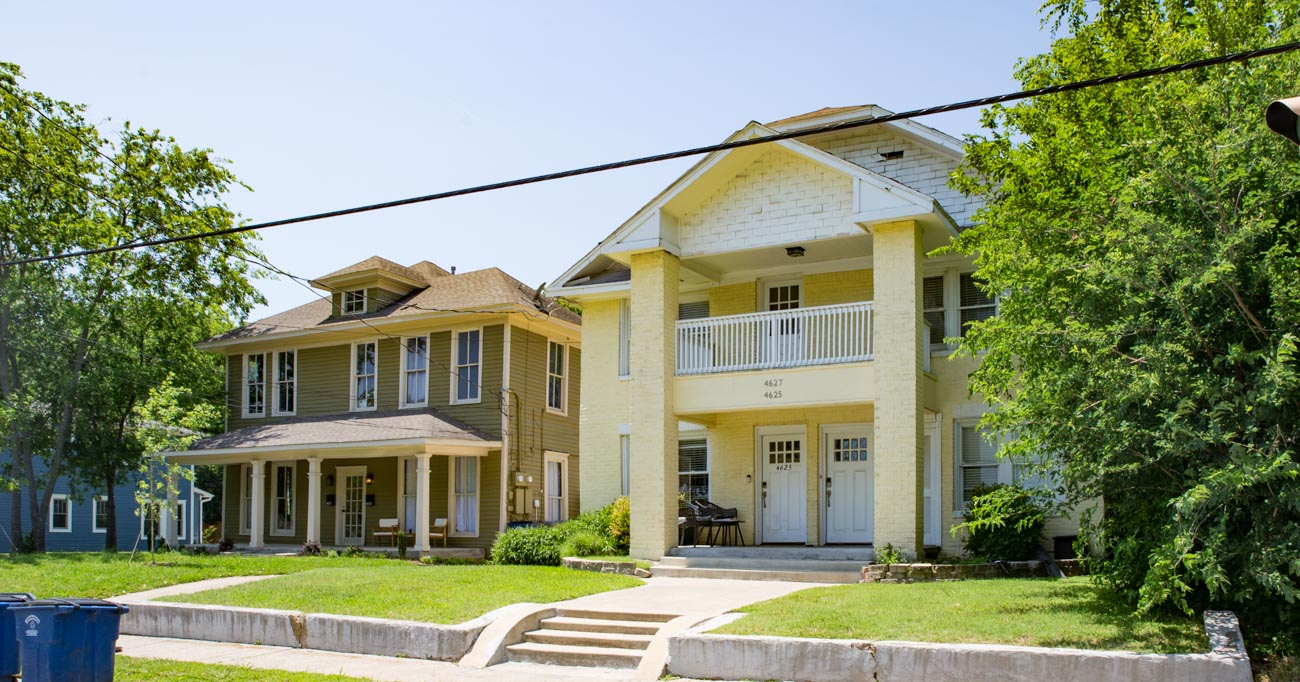
- Country estates built in the second half of the 19th century
- Interactive map of Peak's Suburban Addition
- Coordinates: 32°47′55.72″N 96°46′19.89″W
- Country: United States of America
- State: Texas
- County: Dallas County
- City: Dallas
- Time zone: UTC-6:00 (CST)
  - Summer (DST): UTC-5:00 (CDT)
- Website: www.peaksaddition.org

Peak's Suburban Addition is a historic residential neighborhood and historic district in east Dallas, Texas, United States. The district's boundaries are, roughly, N. Fitzhugh Street to the northeast, Sycamore to the northwest, Peak Street and Haskell Street toward the southwest, and Worth Street along the southeast. Peak's Suburban is East Dallas' oldest subdivision and oldest residential neighborhood.

== Early history ==
The land that encompasses much of the district now was formerly a plantation settled by Jefferson Peak. Peak was a veteran of the Mexican War. Peak was an early Dallas real estate developer. Peak purchased land and built a home in 1855 at the corner of Worth and Peak streets, and it was the first brick house in Dallas.

Peak, like many early settlers, was a beneficiary of large land grants. He reportedly traveled through East Dallas on his way to fight in the Mexican War in 1846 and never forgot the territory, eventually making it his home. Peak, sometimes referred to as the "father of East Dallas," initially relocated to Dallas in 1855.

After the Civil War, Peak was joined by other large landowners purchasing in the area, including William H. Gaston, a former Confederate Army Captain. He purchased 400 acres along White Rock Road (now Swiss Avenue). Gaston was instrumental in bringing railroads and other industry to East Dallas, which resulted in a housing shortage. The housing shortage helped encourage Jefferson Peak and others to begin subdividing their lands.

Prior to being incorporated as the city of East Dallas in 1882, the majority of the settlement in the area had been agriculture related.

Jefferson Peak platted the first of his family's subdivisions along Ross Avenue in 1874.

Peak and his son, Junius Peak, divided the family plantation in to a section of 16 blocks, which were sold as the Peak's Suburban Addition starting in 1879. Streets were named after the Peak family children: Worth, Carroll, Junius, Victor, and Flora. Many of these streets today cross between the Junius Heights Historic District, Munger Place Historic District, and Peak's Suburban Historic District. Peak initially owned all the land from Elm Street to Capital Street and to Carroll and Haskell Avenues.

After Jefferson Peak died in 1885, his son, Junius, began the larger-scale division and selloff of the family's extensive land holdings. The land around the Old Peak Homestead at Worth and Peak Streets was originally sold as Peak's Addition in 1897. Its development spurred many housing starts in East Dallas.

Jefferson Peak's son in law, Thomas Field, was also an active real estate developer in East Dallas during the 1880s and 1890s. His firm, Field and Field Real Estate and Financial Agents, he managed to control or influence the sale of very large parcels of East Dallas land. He located his home on Peak Avenue between Gaston and Junius Streets.

== Streetcars Aided Development ==
The introduction of streetcar lines in East Dallas between 1887 and 1893—and the initiation of service around 1888—were keys to real estate development in the Peaks Addition area. The "Bryan Line," was one of the major crosstown streetcar lines serving northern sections of East Dallas, and others followed, connecting the neighborhood to Dallas' central business district.

== Architecture ==
The district includes examples of residential architecture dating from the 1890s to the 1930s. Styles visible in the district include late Queen Anne, Tudor Revival, Classical Revival, Mission Revival, Victorian, and Craftsman bungalows. In addition, Peak's Suburban includes some examples of "streetcar apartments," from the 1920s and 1930s.

The neighborhood includes the highest concentration of Victorian homes in Dallas.
