= Old East Dallas, Dallas =

Community in Dallas, Texas, USA

Old East Dallas
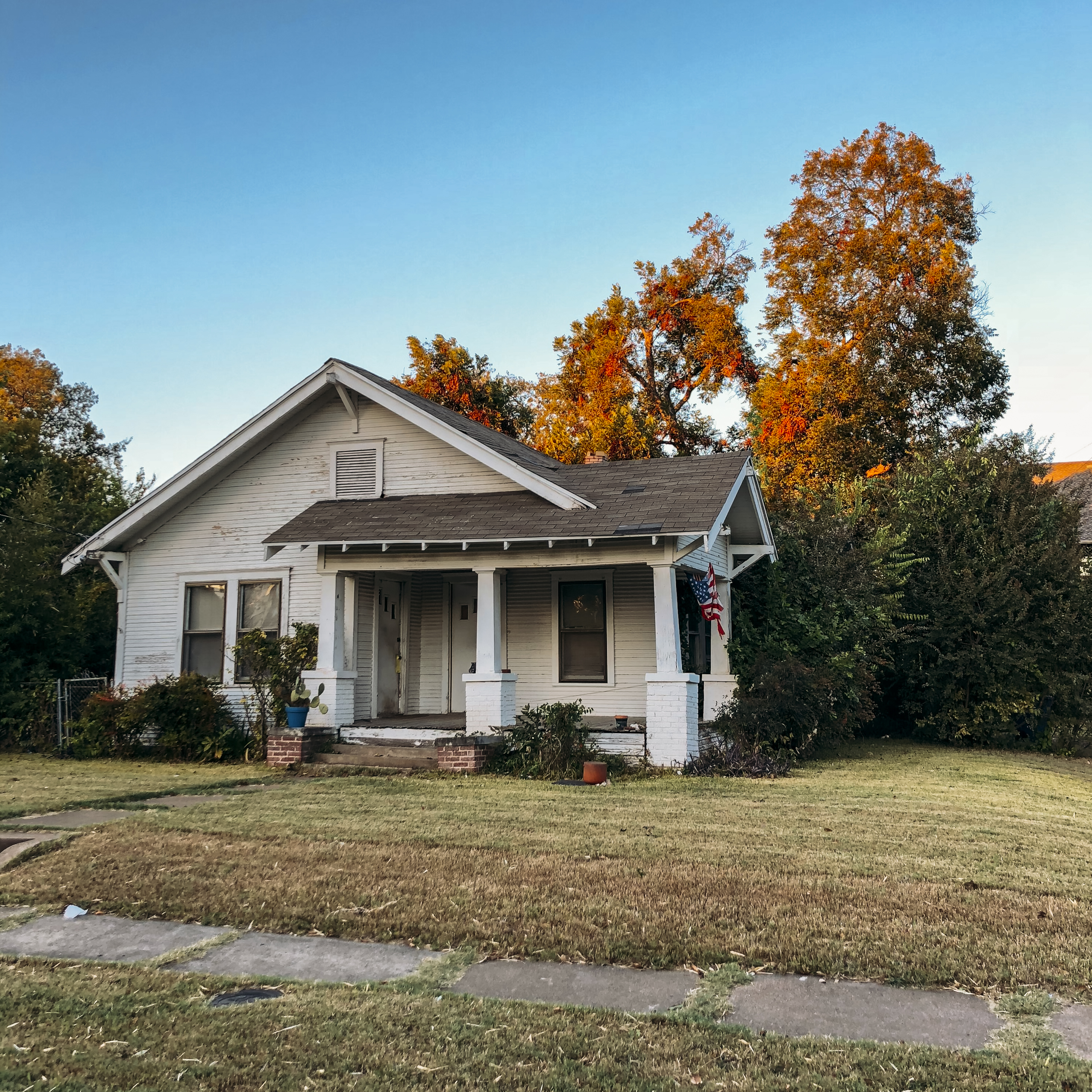
- An old house in Old East Dallas
- Interactive map of Old East Dallas
- Coordinates: 32°47′59.17″N 96°46′35.46″W
- Country: United States
- State: Texas
- County: Dallas
- City: Dallas

Area
  - Total: 2.41 sq mi (6.2 km^{2})
  - Water: 0 sq mi (0 km^{2}) 0%
- Elevation: 505 ft (154 m)

Population (2014)
  - Total: 43,143
- ZIP code: 75214, 75204
- Area codes: 214, 469, 972

Old East Dallas is a historic community consisting of several neighborhoods in east Dallas, Texas, (USA). In 1890, the city was annexed into Dallas, making Dallas the largest city in Texas. Contrary to what its name implies, East Dallas is rich with culture both old and new; after the annexation, entrepreneurs and creatives occupied then shabby warehouses, turning them into clubs and venues, bringing culture and many social scenes that still thrive today in what is now Deep Ellum, among other neighborhoods of this district.

== History ==
The area began as a 40-acre (162,000 m^{2}) tract east of the city of Dallas. The Beeman family had settled there in the 1860s and in 1872, William H. Gaston began promoting the area for development. Four families settled there at the time, but when the railroads came to Dallas, a number of railroad workers came and built houses between Dallas and East Dallas.

Gaston gave the railroad companies US$5,000 and free right-of-way through his land to persuade them to build through East Dallas. The Houston and Texas Central Railroad arrived on 16 July 1872 and the Texas and Pacific Railway arrived on 22 February 1873.

On 9 September 1882, the area was incorporated into a city called "East Dallas" (though many thought it should be called "Gaston") on a tract of 1,400 acres (5,670,000 m^{2}). The small town used an aldermanic form of government and in 1883 it passed a tax ordinance to raise money for civic services. In 1883, the first schools in the area were built for 400 white students and 60 black students. In 1886, the first all-brick schoolhouse in Dallas County was constructed in East Dallas. This school was also the East Dallas City Hall. Until 1900, when the City of Dallas annexed East Dallas, the ground floor held the municipal offices, and the upper floors housed the school. In 1922, Baylor Hospital acquired the building.

Fair grounds were originally located near what is now I-45 and Pacific Avenue. They were relocated to the area of Gaston and Hall Street in 1872. In 1887, the State Fair of Texas and Dallas Exposition at Fair Park opened, giving the area further growth. This third location is where the Fair still occurs. By the late 1880s, East Dallas had 6,000 residents and by 1889, 90% of the homes in the city had running water.

In 1889, Texas state senator R.S. Kimbrough tried to get a bill run through the state legislature to remove East Dallas' charter so it could be annexed into Dallas. It is generally believed that the act was to make Dallas the largest city in Texas; and the efforts in fact did make Dallas the largest city in Texas by the 1890 census. On 31 December 1889, the day before East Dallas became part of Dallas, East Dallas' city council passed $45,000 in street improvements which the city of Dallas had to finance. Under the newly adopted charter, the city of Dallas took in all of East Dallas' debt.

== Neighborhoods ==
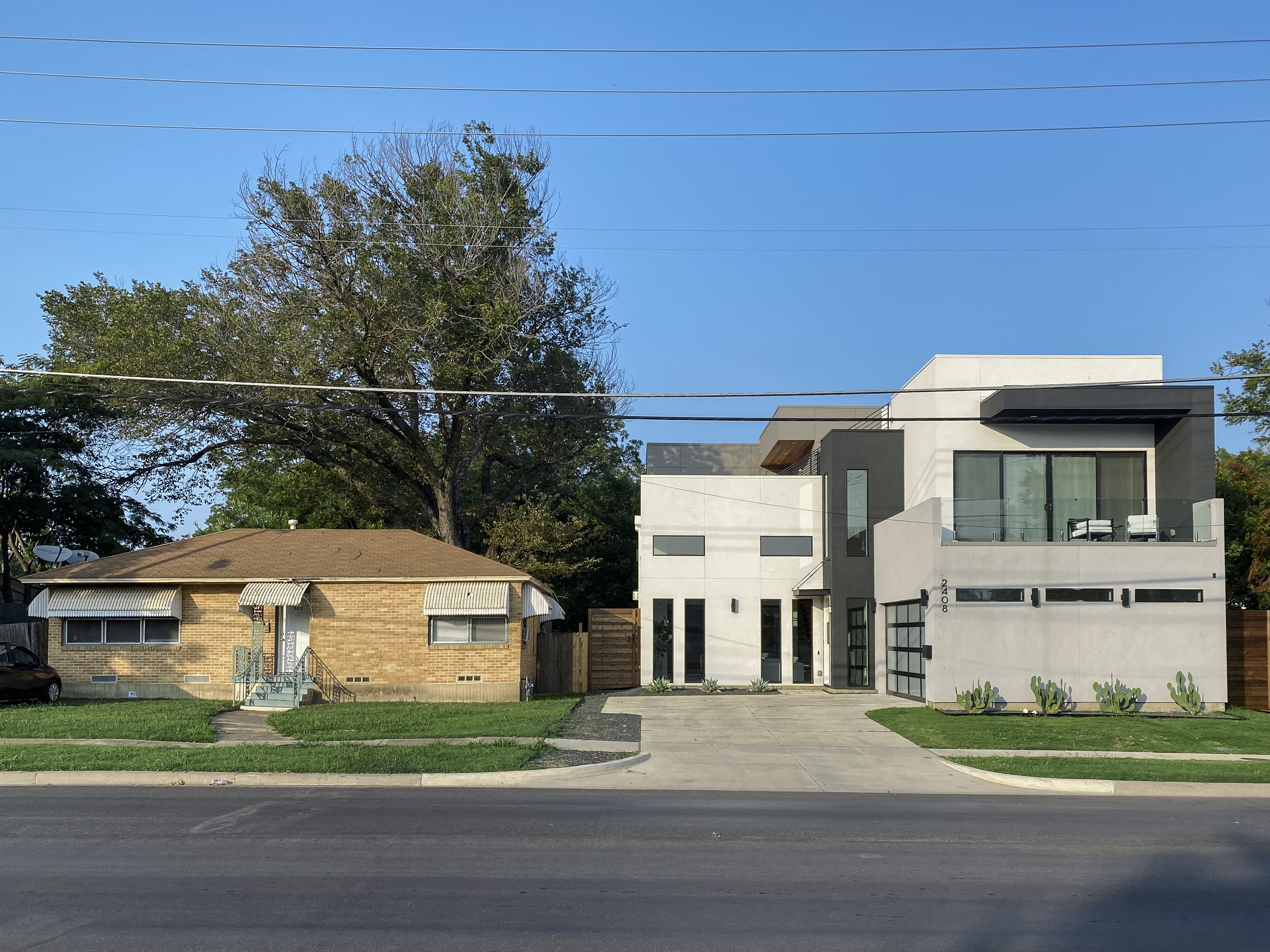
Gentrification with an old and a new home side by side in Old East Dallas

- Baylor-Meadows
- Belmont Park
- Bryan Place
- Cityplace
- Cochran Heights
- Deep Ellum
- Fitzhugh-Capitol
- Mill Creek
- Mount Auburn
- Munger Place Historic District
- Peak's Suburban Addition
- Rosewood
- Swiss Avenue
- Junius Heights Historic District

== Notable people ==
Lee Patton, legendary basketball coach at West Virginia University; grew up in OED.
