= Balch Springs, Texas =

Balch Springs
- City
- City of Balch Springs
- Wordmark
- Interactive map of Balch Springs
- Location in Texas Balch Springs (the United States) Balch Springs (North America)
- Coordinates: 32°43′12″N 96°37′25″W
- Country: United States
- State: Texas
- County: Dallas
- Incorporated: June 13, 1953

Government
  - Type: Council-manager

Area
  - Total: 9.04 sq mi (23.42 km^{2})
  - Land: 9.02 sq mi (23.37 km^{2})
  - Water: 0.019 sq mi (0.05 km^{2}) 0.27%
- Elevation: 479 ft (146 m)

Population (2020)
  - Total: 27,685
  - Density: 3,068/sq mi (1,185/km^{2})
- Time zone: UTC-6 (CST)
  - Summer (DST): UTC-5 (CDT)
- ZIP code: 75180
- Area codes: 214, 469, 945, 972
- FIPS code: 48-05372
- GNIS feature ID: 2409775
- Website: https://www.balchspringstx.gov

Balch Springs (/bɑːltʃ/ BAHLTCH) is a city in Dallas County, Texas, United States. It is an inner-ring suburb of Dallas and part of the Dallas–Fort Worth metroplex. Its population was 27,685 at the 2020 census. It was 23,728 at the 2010 census, and 25,007 at 2019's census estimates.

== History ==
The area was first settled in the 1840s. Around 1879, John M. Balch and his family settled south of Mesquite in unincorporated Dallas County. Mr. Balch found several springs on his land, one of which ran year-round. Local residents began referring to the springs on Mr. Balch's property as Balch Springs, and use of the name continued even after he moved away a few years after his arrival. Around 1885, a county school was named after the springs. A small church and a cemetery were near the school. During the early 1900s, the community was widely dispersed and consisted mostly of farms. Electricity, provided by Texas Power and Light, was introduced in 1939. Gas and telephone service arrived shortly after World War II.

The community began to grow rapidly along with the city of Dallas and other Dallas County towns. To avoid annexation by Dallas, Balch Springs incorporated as a city on June 13, 1953. The new city encompassed the communities of Balch Springs, Zipp City, Five Points, Jonesville, and Triangle, as well as portions of Rylie and Kleberg. A mayor-council form of government was adopted after incorporation. By 1956, Balch Springs had a population around 3,500. The city was home to 6,821 residents at the 1960 census. In September 1964, a post office opened in the city and in 1965, the first taxes were levied. A 1966 attempt to disincorporate the community was unsuccessful. By 1970, the population had risen to 10,464 as the construction of new roads made commuting to surrounding cities easier. In 1988, residents voted to become part of the neighboring city of Mesquite, but the election was declared invalid. Two years later, the 1990 census reported a total of 17,406 people living in the city. The 2000 population was 19,375.

The murder of Jordan Edwards occurred in Balch Springs in 2017.

== Geography ==
Balch Springs is situated approximately 16 miles (26 km) east of downtown Dallas and 34 miles (55 km) southeast of the Dallas/Fort Worth International Airport. The city is bordered by Mesquite to the north and east, and Dallas to the south and west.

Major highways running through Balch Springs include Interstate 635, which bisects the city into two nearly equal halves. Interstate 20 and U.S. Highway 175 run along Balch Springs' southern border.

According to the United States Census Bureau, the city has a total area of 9.0 square miles (23.3 km^{2}), of which 0.02 square miles (0.06 km^{2}), or 0.27%, is covered by water.

== Demographics ==
Historical population
Census	Pop.	Note	%±
1960	6,821		—
1970	10,464		53.4%
1980	13,746		31.4%
1990	17,406		26.6%
2000	19,375		11.3%
2010	23,728		22.5%
2020	27,685		16.7%
U.S. Decennial Census

=== 2020 census ===
As of the 2020 census, Balch Springs had a population of 27,685, 8,284 households, and 5,522 families residing in the city. The median age was 31.2 years. 31.3% of residents were under the age of 18 and 8.3% of residents were 65 years of age or older. For every 100 females there were 94.3 males, and for every 100 females age 18 and over there were 91.7 males age 18 and over.

100.0% of residents lived in urban areas, while 0% lived in rural areas.

There were 8,284 households in Balch Springs, of which 49.8% had children under the age of 18 living in them. Of all households, 45.7% were married-couple households, 16.7% were households with a male householder and no spouse or partner present, and 30.5% were households with a female householder and no spouse or partner present. About 17.7% of all households were made up of individuals and 5.9% had someone living alone who was 65 years of age or older.

There were 8,692 housing units, of which 4.7% were vacant. Among occupied housing units, 55.6% were owner-occupied and 44.4% were renter-occupied. The homeowner vacancy rate was 1.3% and the rental vacancy rate was 5.7%.

Racial composition as of the 2020 census
Race	Percent
White	27.1%
Black or African American	22.7%
American Indian and Alaska Native	2.1%
Asian	1.0%
Native Hawaiian and Other Pacific Islander	0.1%
Some other race	26.4%
Two or more races	20.5%
Hispanic or Latino (of any race)	59.5%

== Government ==
Balch Springs has a mayor-council form of government, with a mayor and six council members. Five of the six are elected in single-member districts, while the mayor and remaining council member are elected at-large.

A city manager is appointed to serve at the pleasure of the city council. The current city manager is Charles R. Fenner, serving since 2023.

Current Balch Springs City Council
Position	Occupant	Term Expires
Mayor	Rodney Taylor	2027
Place 2 (At-Large)	Tartisha Hill	2026
Place 3	Paula Garcia	2027
Place 4	Vincent Gabriel	2026
Place 5	Jessie Patino	2027
Place 6	Elishima Myles	2026
Place 7	Yemi Salau	2027

== Politics ==
Balch Springs city vote by party in Presidential elections
Year	Democratic	Republican	Third Parties
2024	65.0% 3,608	33.6% 1,866	1.4% 79
2020	70.1% 4,256	28.6% 1,734	1.3% 78
2016	67.0% 3,344	29.9% 1,490	3.1% 155

== Education ==
=== Public schools ===
The southwestern portion of Balch Springs is served by Dallas Independent School District, while the northeastern portion is served by Mesquite Independent School District. The two portions are roughly each one half of the city.

==== Mesquite Independent School District ====
Mesquite ISD students living in Balch Springs are zoned to one of the following elementary schools, according to the following feeder patterns approved by the district in 2017.

Elementary School (Through 5th Grade)	Middle School (Grades 6–8)	High School (Grades 9–12)
Floyd Elementary School (Balch Springs)	A.C. New Middle School (Balch Springs)	West Mesquite High School (Mesquite)
Gray Elementary School (Balch Springs)	A.C. New Middle School (Balch Springs)	West Mesquite High School (Mesquite)
Hodges Elementary School (Balch Springs)	A.C. New Middle School (Balch Springs)	West Mesquite High School (Mesquite)
McWhorter Elementary School (Mesquite)	Frasier Middle School (Mesquite)	West Mesquite High School (Mesquite)
Mackey Elementary School (Balch Springs)	Terry Middle School (Mesquite)	John Horn High School (Mesquite)
Gentry Elementary School (Mesquite)	Berry Middle School (Mesquite)	John Horn High School (Mesquite)
Moss Elementary School (Mesquite)	Agnew Middle School (Mesquite)	Mesquite High School (Mesquite)

Most Mesquite ISD students living in Balch Springs are zoned to A.C. New Middle School and West Mesquite High School. Some MISD students (in the portion zoned to Gentry) are zoned to Berry Middle School and John Horn High School. A small portion of Balch Springs (the portion zoned to Moss) is zoned to Agnew Middle School and Mesquite High School.

==== Dallas Independent School District ====
W. W. Samuell High School serves a portion of the DISD section of Balch Springs.

DISD elementary schools which have sections of Balch Springs in their attendance boundaries include Gilbert Cuellar Sr., Richard Lagow, John W. Runyon, and Kleberg.

Young Women's STEAM Academy at Balch Springs Middle School is in the city limits. The school, which opened in 2012, previously was a coeducational middle school serving most of the DISD portion, while other portions were zoned to Fred F. Florence Middle School. In the fall of 2016 Balch Springs was converted into a girls-only middle school; boys in its zone were zoned to Florence, now an all-boys school. Students from the former Balch Springs MS zone who wish to attend a coeducational middle school would go to E. B. Comstock Middle School, while those from the former Florence zone would go to Piedmont G.L.O.B.A.L. Academy (formerly John B. Hood Middle School) in Pleasant Grove. In addition Seagoville Middle School serves both genders in a portion of Balch Springs.

H. Grady Spruce High School, W. W. Samuell High School, and Seagoville High School serve portions of the DISD area of Balch Springs.

=== Private schools ===
Balch Springs Christian Academy is a private school within the city limits that serves students from kindergarten to 12th grade, and uses the A Beka curriculum. It is a subsidiary of Seagoville Road Baptist Church, which was established in 1974. Ten members of the school and church died in a flood in central Texas in 1987.

=== Colleges and universities ===
Dallas County residents are zoned to Dallas College (formerly Dallas County Community College or DCCCD).

== Public safety ==
Balch Springs Fire Department serves the city with one fire station, which runs one ladder truck, two engines, one fire chief, and three battalion chiefs. The department has a minimum manning of eight firefighters on shift 24/7. All firefighters are certified as EMTs or paramedics. Balch Springs has 30 professional firefighters, one chief, and an inspector. The Balch Springs Fire Department is a civil-service department. The department responds and manages all fire and emergent health calls.

The city maintains a police department.

== Library ==
The Balch Springs Library-Learning Center is located at 12450 Elam Road in Balch Springs. The library, which has over 26,000 items, including over 25,000 books and over 1,000 audio and visual items, opened in April 2006.

== Healthcare ==
Dallas ISD and Parkland Balch Springs Youth and Family Health Center is on a site next to the Balch Springs Middle School building, on the school property. It serves disadvantaged children who do not have primary care physicians. Previously, the center was known as the Spruce Youth and Family Health Center and was housed on the grounds of H. Grady Spruce High School in Dallas. On June 3, 2013, it moved to its current location.
