= Chad Slaughter =

American football player (born 1978)

No. 78, 69, 68
- Position: Offensive tackle

Personal information
- Born: June 4, 1978 (age 48); Dallas, Texas, U.S.
- Listed height: 6 ft 8 in (2.03 m)
- Listed weight: 340 lb (154 kg)

Career information
- High school: Justin F. Kimball (Dallas)
- College: Alcorn State
- NFL draft: 2000: undrafted

Career history
- Dallas Cowboys (2000)*; New York Jets (2000); Dallas Cowboys (2001)*; Oakland Raiders (2001–2006); Baltimore Ravens (2008)*; Jacksonville Jaguars (2008); Baltimore Ravens (2008)
- * Offseason or practice squad member only

Career NFL statistics
- Games played: 49
- Games started: 7
- Fumble recoveries: 1
- Stats at Pro Football Reference

Chadwick Von Slaughter (born June 4, 1978) is an American former professional football player who was an offensive tackle in the National Football League (NFL) for the New York Jets, Oakland Raiders, Baltimore Ravens and Jacksonville Jaguars. He played college football for the Alcorn State Braves.

== Early life ==
Slaughter attended Justin F. Kimball High School, where he was a three-sport athlete in football, basketball, and track and field.

In football, he was a two-way player. As a senior, he received All-District honors as both an offensive and defensive lineman. He was also an All-District honoree in basketball and in track as a shotputter.

== College career ==
Slaughter accepted a football scholarship from Alcorn State University. As a junior, he was named a starter at left tackle, contributing to the team ranking second in conference in total offense and having a 1,000-yard running back.

He also competed in basketball (center) and track (shot put).

== Professional career ==
=== Dallas Cowboys (first stint) ===
Slaughter was signed as an undrafted free agent by the Dallas Cowboys after the 2000 NFL draft. He was waived before the start of the season on August 21.

=== New York Jets ===
On August 23, 2000, he was claimed off waivers by the New York Jets. As a rookie, he was declared inactive for all 16 games. He was released on August 6, 2001.

=== Dallas Cowboys (second stint) ===
In 2001, he was claimed off waivers by the Dallas Cowboys. He was released on August 28, 2001.

=== Oakland Raiders ===
On October 3, 2001, he was signed by the Oakland Raiders to their practice squad. In 2002, he was declared inactive for all 16 games during the regular season and for the 3 playoff games.

In 2003, he appeared in 6 games with one start, playing mostly on special teams. He started in the season finale against the San Diego Chargers.

In 2004, he appeared in 10 games as a backup tackle and guard.

In 2005, he appeared in 10 games, focusing primarily on special teams, He had his first extended action on offense in the season finale against the New York Giants, when he was forced to replace an injured Robert Gallery at right tackle, while helping to prevent Pro Bowler Michael Strahan from recording a sack.

In 2006, he appeared in 15 games with 6 starts at left tackle. He was released on September 1, 2007.

=== Baltimore Ravens (first stint) ===
On July 30, 2008, he was signed as a free agent by the Baltimore Ravens, to provide depth after tackles Jared Gaither and Adam Terry suffered ankle injuries. He was released on August 30.

=== Jacksonville Jaguars ===
On September 9, 2008, he signed as a free agent with the Jacksonville Jaguars. On September 13, he was released before appearing in any games.

=== Baltimore Ravens (second stint) ===
On November 18, 2008, he was signed by the Baltimore Ravens. He appeared in 6 games as a backup offensive tackle. He wasn't re-signed after the season.

== Personal life ==
In 2011, he began working at Trinidad Garza Early College High School, teaching entrepreneurship, Sports and Entertainment Marketing, and Business Management.
