= Belmont Park, Dallas =

Coordinates: 32.810°N 96.787°W

Belmont Park is a neighborhood in Old East Dallas, Texas (USA). The neighborhood is located near the area now known as Cityplace, and also near Uptown; it is 2 miles from the center of Downtown Dallas. The boundaries of the neighborhood are North Carroll Avenue, Coles Manor Place, Kirby Street, and Weldon Street.

The neighborhood consists of a collection of houses constructed in 1943 and 1944. The houses were known as "G.I. homes", as they were built for soldiers returning from World War II. The houses are built on an area that was once the Belmont Park Golf Course. The neighborhood is surrounded by upscale apartments and retail and is close to restaurants, retail stores and the Arts District. It is one of the few neighborhoods where homes are still available close to downtown Dallas versus apartments.
