= Seagoville, Texas =

- City
- Location of Seagoville in Dallas County, Texas
- Coordinates: 32°38′40″N 96°32′30″W
- Country: United States
- State: Texas
- Counties: Dallas, Kaufman

Government
  - Type: Council-Manager

Area
  - Total: 19.05 sq mi (49.33 km^{2})
  - Land: 18.78 sq mi (48.65 km^{2})
  - Water: 0.26 sq mi (0.68 km^{2}) 1.58%
- Elevation: 440 ft (130 m)

Population (2020)
  - Total: 18,446
  - Density: 982.0/sq mi (379.2/km^{2})
- Time zone: UTC-6 (CST)
  - Summer (DST): UTC-5 (CDT)
- ZIP code: 75159
- Area codes: 214, 469, 945, 972
- FIPS code: 48-66428
- GNIS feature ID: 2411849
- Website: seagoville.us

Seagoville (/ˈsiːɡoʊvɪl/ SEE-goh-vil) is a city in Dallas County, Texas, United States, and a suburb of Dallas. A small portion of Seagoville extends into Kaufman County. Its population was 18,446 at the 2020 census. The city is located along U.S. Highway 175, 10 miles (16 km) from downtown Mesquite.

== History ==
Seagoville was originally called Seago, and under this name was laid out in 1876 by T. K. Seago (1836–1904), and named after him. The United States Post Office changed the town's name to "Seagoville" in 1910 to prevent confusion with another city in Texas called Sego.

During World War II, the Federal Reformatory for Women in Seagoville was the site of an Immigration and Naturalization Service detention camp for Japanese, German, and Italian Americans classified as "enemy aliens" and women of Japanese and German ancestry deported from Latin America. Internees at Seagoville published a German-language newsletter called the Sägedorfer Fliegende Blätter. The camp housed up to 647 people, and was closed in June 1945, after the internees were either "repatriated" to Japan or Germany, or transferred to Crystal City, Texas.

== Geography ==
According to the United States Census Bureau, the city has a total area of 19.0 square miles (49.2 km^{2}), of which 18.7 square miles (48.4 km^{2}) are land and 0.31 sq mi (0.8 km^{2}), or 1.58%, is covered by water.

== Demographics ==
Historical population
Census	Pop.	Note	%±
1930	604		—
1940	760		25.8%
1950	1,927		153.6%
1960	3,745		94.3%
1970	4,390		17.2%
1980	7,304		66.4%
1990	8,969		22.8%
2000	10,823		20.7%
2010	14,835		37.1%
2020	18,446		24.3%
2023 (est.)	19,643		6.5%
U.S. Decennial Census

=== 2020 census ===
As of the 2020 census, Seagoville had a population of 18,446. The median age was 34.2 years; 27.5% of residents were under 18 and 9.6% were 65 or older. For every 100 females, there were 117.3 males, and for every 100 females 18 and over, there were 123.4 males age 18 and over.

Most of the residents lived in urban areas, while 3.4% lived in rural areas.

Of the 5,136 households in Seagoville, 48.2% had children under 18 living in them, 49.6% were married-couple households, 15.9% were households with a male householder and no spouse or partner present, and 27.0% were households with a female householder and no spouse or partner present. About 18.0% of all households were made up of individuals, and 7.5% had someone living alone who was 65 years of age or older.

The city had 5,353 housing units, of which 4.1% were vacant. The homeowner vacancy rate was 1.1% and the rental vacancy rate was 6.3%.

Racial composition as of the 2020 census
Race	Number	Percentage
White	7,919	42.9%
Black or African American	3,392	18.4%
American Indian and Alaska Native	291	1.6%
Asian	106	0.6%
Native Hawaiian and other Pacific Islander	17	0.1%
Some other race	3,828	20.8%
Two or more races	2,893	15.7%
Hispanic or Latino (of any race)	8,769	47.5%

== Government and infrastructure ==
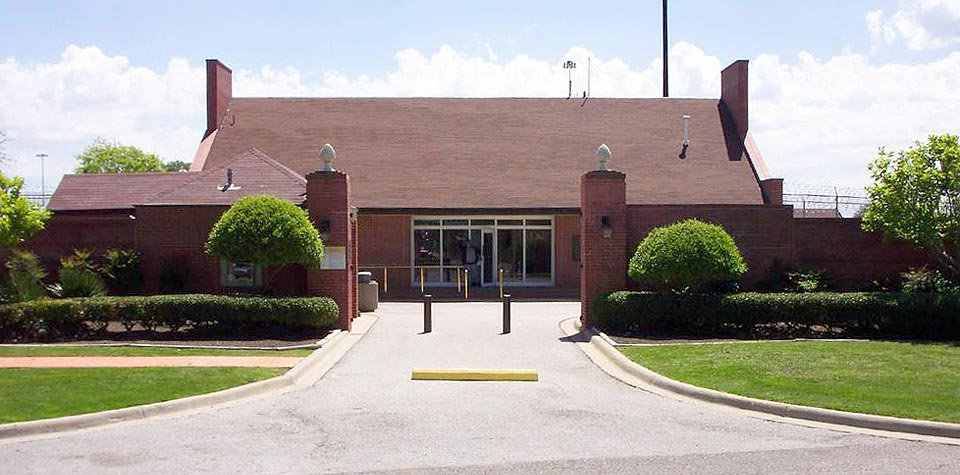
Federal Correctional Institution, Seagoville

Federal Correctional Institution, Seagoville is located in Seagoville.

The United States Postal Service operates the Seagoville Post Office on Seagoville Road in Kleberg, Dallas. It was previously located at 314 Glendale Avenue, in a rented facility in Seagoville. Since around 1882 a post office had been located in the Seagoville city limits. In 2011, the USPS announced that it was closing the existing Seagoville post office and consolidating it into the Kleberg Post Office, a USPS-owned facility since renamed to the Seagoville Post Office, citing cost-cutting reasons in response to a budget shortfall. Though individuals had offered to pay for the rental costs at Seagoville, the USPS insisted on closing the city post office. As of 2011, the Seagoville city post office was busier than the Kleberg one.

== Education ==
=== Primary and secondary schools ===
==== Public schools ====
Portions of Seagoville are within three separate independent school districts.

===== Dallas Independent School District =====
Almost all of the Dallas County portion of Seagoville is served by the Dallas Independent School District. The area is within the Board of Trustees District 4. Portions of Seagoville are zoned to Central Elementary School, Seagoville North Elementary School, and Seagoville Elementary School. All of the city is zoned to Seagoville Middle School (grades 6–8), and Seagoville High School (grades 9–12).

Seagoville North Elementary School was scheduled to open in 2012. Prior to 2012, the students in the Dallas County portion were zoned to Seagoville Elementary School (at the time, prekindergarten–grade 2) and Central Elementary School (at the time, grades 3–5).

Seagoville Elementary, Seagoville North, and Central Elementary are within the Seagoville city limits, while Seagoville Middle and Seagoville High are in Dallas, near the city of Seagoville. Seagoville Alternative Center, an alternative school, is within the city limits.

DISD maintains the Seagoville Stadium.

Seagoville Independent School District was previously the town's school district. In 1965, the district was absorbed into the DISD.

===== Crandall Independent School District =====
The minuscule Kaufman County portion is served by Crandall Independent School District. The students in the Crandall portion are zoned to Wilson Elementary School, Crandall Middle School, and Crandall High School. Wilson Elementary and Crandall Middle are within the city of Crandall. Crandall High is partially in Crandall and partially in unincorporated Kaufman County.

===== Mesquite Independent School District =====
A very small portion of northeast Seagoville is within the boundaries of Mesquite Independent School District. That portion is served by Achziger Elementary School, Terry Middle School, and John Horn High School (all three schools are in Mesquite). The area was formerly zoned to Thompson Elementary School.

===== History of schools =====
The first school established in Seagoville was the Brinegar School. The one-room log schoolhouse, which featured split-log seating, was constructed around 1867 in the area of the modern-day Heard Park. Professor J.T. Doss built a new school building in 1880; it was called Woodside. Another school opened in a four-frame building. A cyclone destroyed one of its rooms in 1903, and in 1909, that school was destroyed in a fire. In 1910, a new brick high-school building opened on the site of what is now Seagoville Elementary School. The building, a two-story facility with four rooms for upper grades upstairs and four rooms for lower grades downstairs, on land on North Kaufman Street, was donated by Ben H. Fly. It was built for about $10,000 ($283,000 adjusted for inflation to 2022), and was known as "The High School" and "the Old Red Schoolhouse".

Seagoville High School first opened in 1928 on land purchased in 1927. This building later burned down, and Central Elementary School opened on the former high-school site. The current high-school facility and Seagoville Middle School opened on a 22-acre (8.9 ha) plot of land donated by M.D. Reeves in 1952: one building opened in 1955 and the other opened in September 1958. Seagoville was in the Seagoville Independent School District until August 1964, when it merged into DISD. The DISD operates the Seagoville Stadium in Seagoville.

=== Public libraries ===
Seagoville has its own public library, the Seagoville Public Library, at 702 North U.S. Highway 175.

=== Community colleges ===
The Texas Legislature defines all of Dallas County (including the vast majority of Seagoville) as being in the Dallas College (formerly Dallas County Community College) district. The portion in Kaufman County is within the Trinity Valley Community College district.

== Notable people ==
- LaMarcus Aldridge - NBA player, attended Seagoville High School
- Chill Wills - actor, born and raised in Seagoville
- Antonio Wilson - NFL player, born in Seagoville
