= Dallas College Mountain View =

Public community college in Dallas, Texas

Dallas College Mountain View Campus
- Type: Public community college
- Established: 1970
- Parent institution: Dallas College
- Chancellor: Justin H. Lonon
- President: Macario Hernandez
- Location: Dallas, Texas, United States; 32.724308°N 96.903474°W
- Campus: Urban
- Colors: Blue and yellow
- Mascot: Lions
- Website: www.dallascollege.edu

Dallas College Mountain View Campus (often stylized as Mountain View or MVC) is a public community college in Dallas, Texas. It is part of Dallas College. The campus opened its doors in 1970 and features an enrollment of about 11,500 credit students and another 9,000 continuing education students. It also offers more than 35 degree and certificate programs.

Trini Garza Early College High School, an early college senior high school of the Dallas Independent School District, is on the college property.
