= Bertram Charles Hill =

British-born American architect

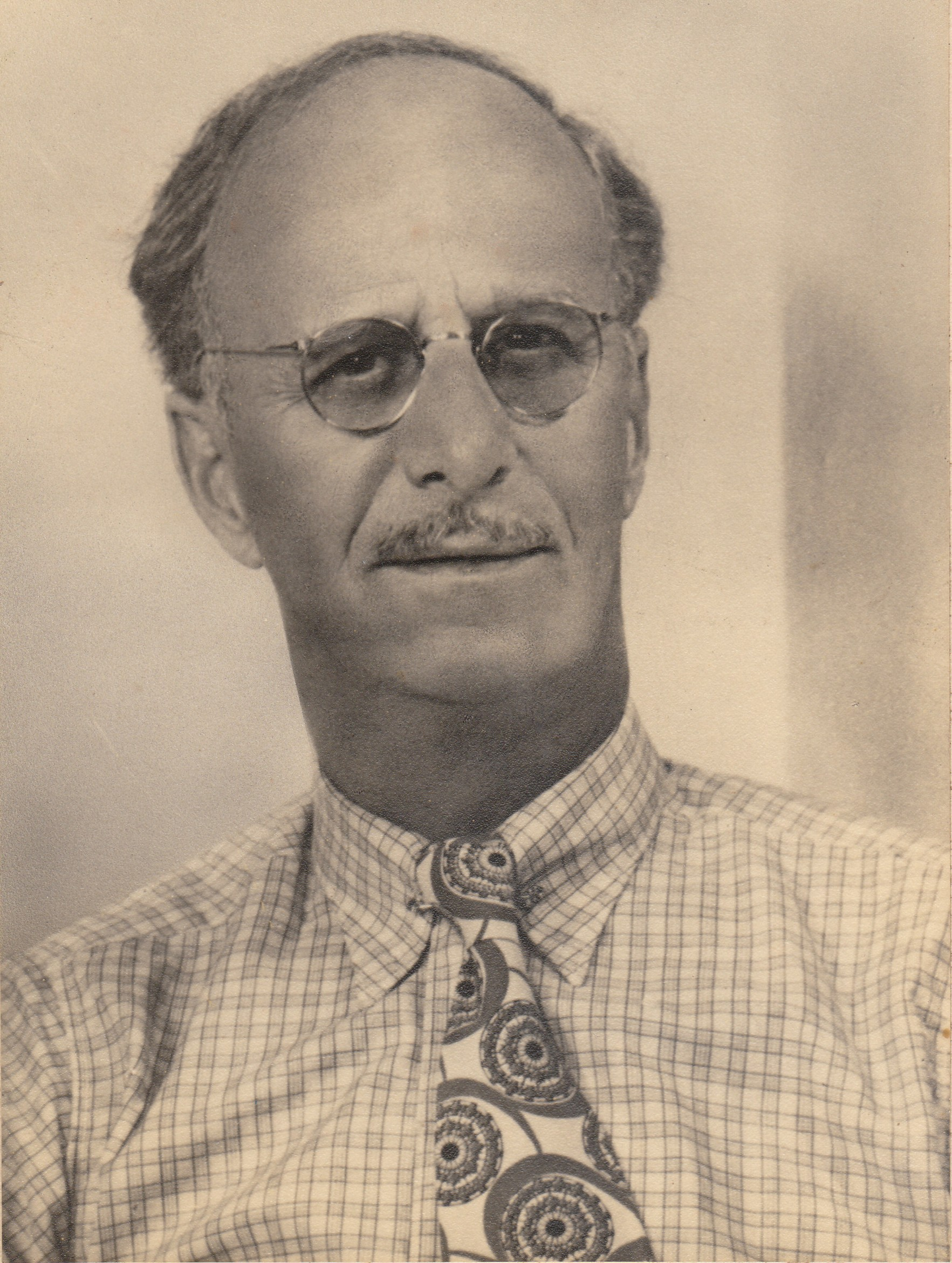
Bertram Charles Hill about 1950

Bertram Charles Hill (27 April 1881 - 29 May 1977) was a British-born architect who made his home in Dallas, Texas, and helped design many of the most famous buildings in the city.

== Early years ==
Bertram Hill was born on 27 April 1881 in the Bedminster district of Bristol, England to William Hill, a prominent Bristol businessman who was head of the British clothing firm of Wathen Gardiner & Co. His brother Stanley Frederick Hill was awarded the Military Cross in WWI. Another brother William John Hill joined their father in Wathen Gardner, and his nephew Patrick Seager Hill became managing director in 1965 of the Wathen Gardiner subsidiary Bristol Uniforms. Although Bertram's family was immersed in the Bristol clothing industry, he chose a different career path, and graduating from the Merchant Venturer's Technical College in Bristol, immigrated as a young man to the United States, where he worked for a short time on the east coast.

== Career ==
Settling in 1905 in Dallas, Texas, Hill worked for the next several years as a draftsman and consultant for various architectural firms. His first major projects were the Adolphus Hotel and the Dallas City Hall (circa 1914), the basement of which is where Lee Harvey Oswald, the assassin of U.S. President John F. Kennedy, was gunned down in 1963 by Jack Ruby. Hill opened his own office in 1921 in Dallas, and designed many private residences from the 1920s through the 1940s in the Swiss Avenue, Gaston Avenue, Lakewood and Highland Park areas. He also worked on commercial properties, apartments, several churches, and the original Dallas and Lakewood Country Club buildings.

== Legacy ==
Hill is especially known for his traditional, grand, Georgian-style homes, many examples of which can be seen in the Swiss Avenue Historic District in East Dallas. However, he also designed a number of more modern-looking residential and commercial properties described as "googie" or "coffee house modern". Many Dallas residences designed by Hill survive, quite a few of which are registered with the Dallas Historic Preservation League. A collection of his personal papers held by the DeGolyer Library at Southern Methodist University contain correspondence, journals, photographs of his work, and designs to several of his buildings. He retired in the Dallas area, where he died on 29 May 1977 at the age of 95 and is buried at Grove Hill Memorial Park.
