= William H. Gaston =

Financier and land developer in Dallas, Texas, USA

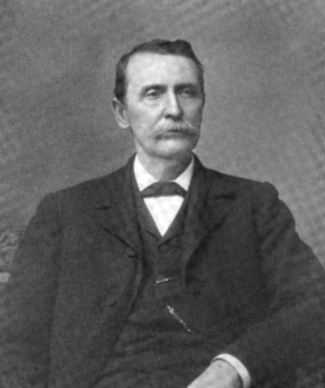
- Born: William Henry Gaston; October 25, 1840; Prairie Bluff, Alabama
- Died: January 24, 1927 (aged 86); Dallas, Texas
- Burial place: Greenwood Cemetery
- Occupation: Businessman

William Henry Gaston (October 25, 1840 – January 24, 1927) was an early Dallas, Texas financier and land developer

== Biography ==
William H. Gaston was born near Prairie Bluff, Alabama on October 25, 1840. From there his family moved first to Mississippi and then in 1849 to Plenitude, Texas.

In 1861, Gaston joined a volunteer company in the Confederate States Army; he was soon elected captain and his company was attached to Hood's Texas Brigade. When he was discharged in June 1865, Gaston returned to farming in Anderson County, Texas. After his first wife died in 1867, he married her sister the next year, and not long after moved to Dallas with $20,000 in gold, the source of which is contested.

In 1868, he and Aaron C. Camp founded Gaston and Camp, the first permanent bank in the city of Dallas. On February 2, 1904, he founded the Gaston National Bank.

In 1872, Gaston began promoting a 40-acre tract east of Dallas's existing boundaries for settlement. In 1882 that area would be incorporated as Old East Dallas, and then annexed by Dallas on January 1, 1900.

He died at his son's home in Dallas on January 24, 1927, and was buried at Greenwood Cemetery.

A middle school in the Dallas Independent School District bears Gaston's name.
