= Innovation, Design, Entrepreneurship Academy =

School in Dallas, Texas

Coordinates: 32°48′20″N 96°46′35″W

Innovation, Design, Entrepreneurship Academy at James W. Fannin is a personalized learning high school in Dallas, Texas and a part of the Dallas Independent School District. It occupies the former James W. Fannin Elementary School, which was built in 1915. The building was listed on the National Register of Historic Places in 1995 and as a Dallas city landmark the following year.
