= Munger Place Historic District =

Historic neighborhood in Dallas, Texas, US

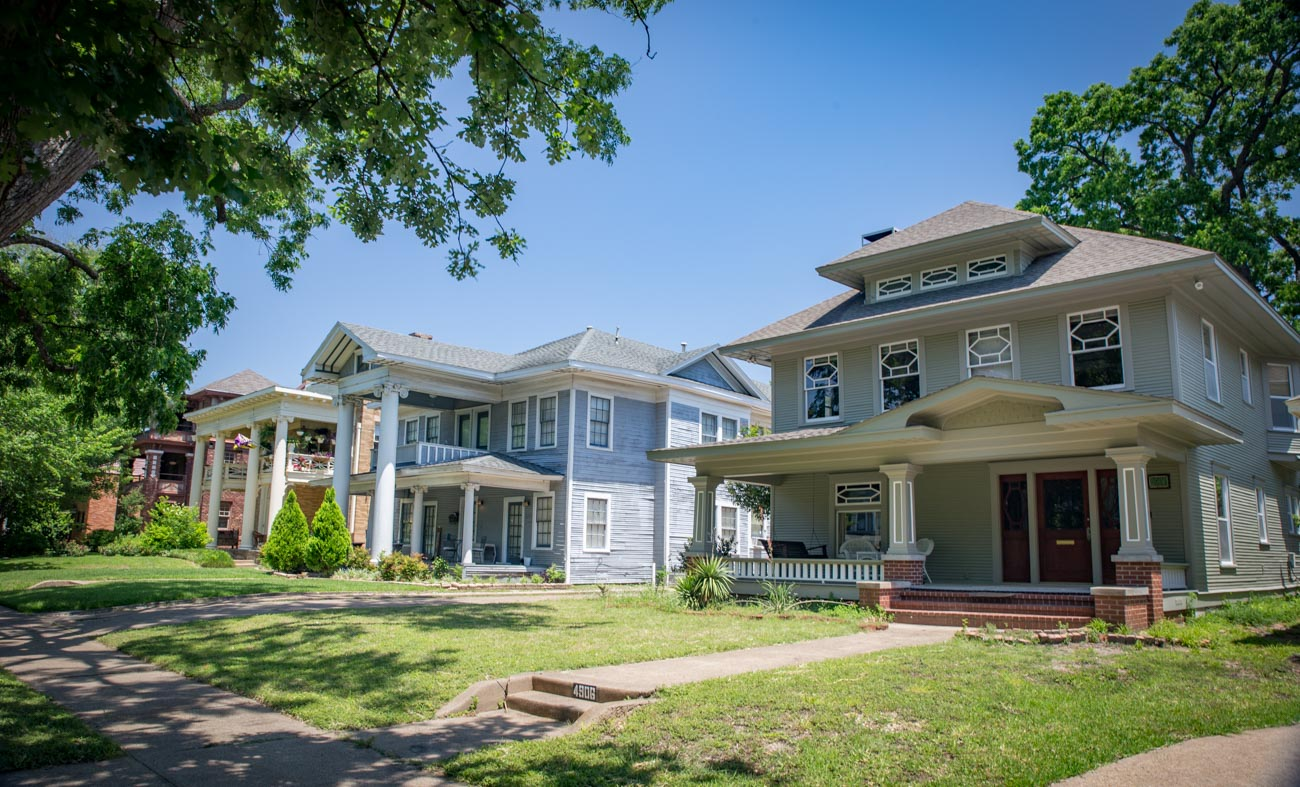
- Munger Place in 2022

- Munger Place Historic District (the United States)
- Coordinates: 32°47′58″N 96°45′51″W
- Country: United States
- State: Texas
- Counties: Dallas
- City: Dallas
- Area: East Dallas
- Community: Old East Dallas

Area
  - Total: 85 acres (34 ha)
- Elevation: 490 ft (150 m)
- ZIP code: 75206, 75214
- Area codes: 214, 469, 972
- Website: Munger Place Historic District
- Munger Place Historic District
- U.S. National Register of Historic Places
- U.S. Historic district
- Dallas Landmark
- Architect: Multiple
- Architectural style: Classical Revival, Prairie School, Bungaloid
- NRHP reference No.: 78002916
- DLMK No.: H/11

Significant dates
- Added to NRHP: September 13, 1978
- Designated DLMK: July 27, 1988

The Munger Place Historic District is a neighborhood and historic district in Old East Dallas, Texas, US, generally lying between North Fitzhugh Avenue on the southwest, Gaston Avenue on the northwest, Henderson Avenue on the northeast, and Columbia Avenue on the southeast. Detailed boundaries are defined in the Munger Place Ordinance. It is a Dallas Landmark District and listed on the National Register of Historic Places.

== History ==
Munger Place was established in 1905 by cotton gin manufacturer Robert S. Munger on 300 acres (1.2 km^{2}) as one of Dallas's first suburbs, and was originally intended to be one of the most exclusive communities in the city. To attract the "right" social element, Munger Place was carefully planned. Just minutes from downtown Dallas by carriage, Munger Place became the very first deed-restricted neighborhood in Texas. Homes had to be a full two stories, cost at least US$2,000 and no house could face a side street. The infrastructure featured such amenities as sidewalks, paved streets, shade trees, sewers, gas mains, and electric street lights. Many of the Dallas' leading businessmen and social elite soon called magnificent Munger Place home.

The Great Depression led many of the community's mansions to be converted into multi-family housing. The neighborhood lost its elite cachet, and by the 1960s many of the nicer houses in the area had been torn down or condemned. Starting in the 1970s, however, Munger Place began to be rediscovered, as enterprising individuals recognized the historic architecture (particularly Prairie Style) and large spaces behind the neighborhood's dilapidated veneer.

== Heritage designations ==
Only a portion of Munger Place is included in the Munger Place Historic District. Munger Place can be described as having northern, western, and southern portions. The northern and western portion of Munger Place is in the Swiss Avenue Historic District. The southern portion generally is in the Munger Place Historic District. Separating the two historic districts is Gaston Avenue, and the lots on either side of Gaston Avenue are excluded from either historic district.

In 1978, the National Park Service added Munger Place Historic District to the National Register of Historic Places. In 1980, the City of Dallas recognized the historic district as a Landmark District. The boundaries of the national and city districts are nearly the same.

Comprising over 250 households, it is the largest collection of Prairie-Style homes in America. With most of the homes now completely renovated, Munger Place has once again been seen as a desirable neighborhood for families looking for historic homes near downtown Dallas. Each year the neighborhood holds a home tour and art festival that attracts fans of historic architecture and independent artists.

== Education ==
The neighborhood is served by the Dallas Independent School District (DISD).

Residents in the neighborhood northeast of N Fitzhugh Avenue are zoned to William Lipscomb Elementary School (grades PK-5) in Junius Heights, J.L. Long Middle School, and Woodrow Wilson High School. Residents in the neighborhood southwest of N Fitzhugh Avenue (along a short section of Tremont Street) are zoned to Ignacio Zaragoza Elementary School, Alex W. Spence Middle School, and North Dallas High School.

Residents' children also attend various magnet schools in the district, as well as a variety of private schools in and around the area including Holy Trinity Catholic School, St. Thomas Aquinas Catholic School, Lakehill Preparatory School, St. John's Episcopal School and First Baptist Academy.

== Photo gallery ==
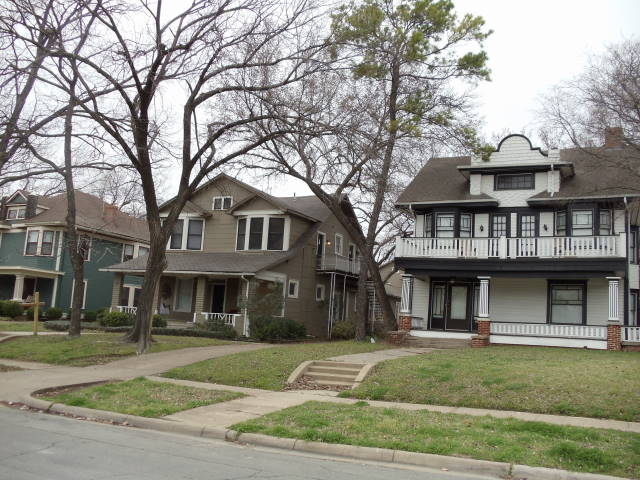

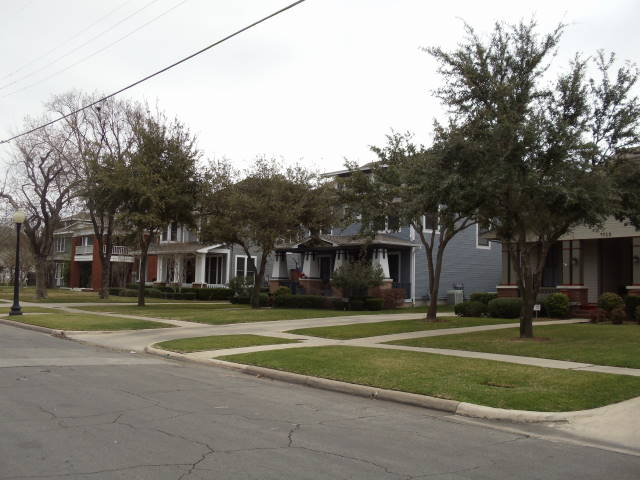

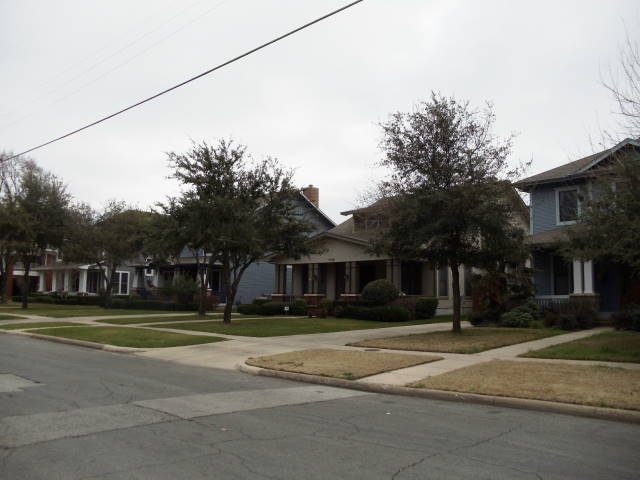

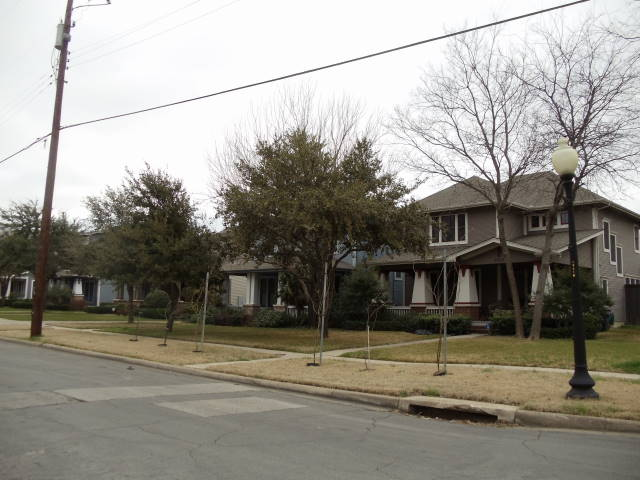

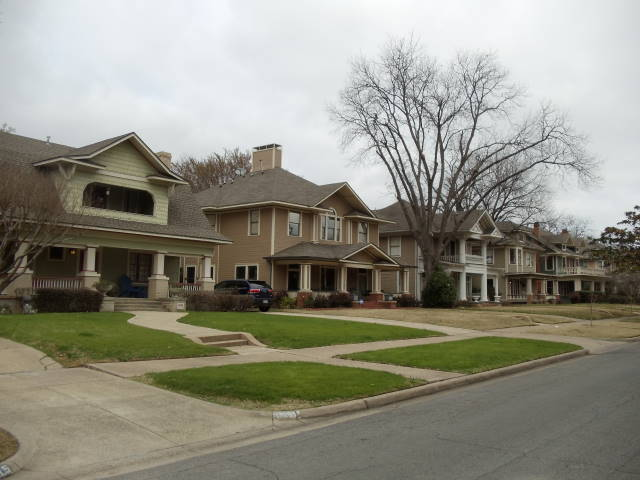

== See also ==
- National Register of Historic Places listings in Dallas County, Texas
- List of Dallas Landmarks
