= Janmar, Dallas =

Janmar is a subdivision in North Dallas, Texas.

Janmar was developed from 1953 to 1960. It was named after Janet and Margaret, the daughters of the developer. Many of the houses have contemporary architecture. The Round House, built in 1962, is located there.

== Education ==
Janmar residents are located in the Dallas Independent School District. It is zoned to Arthur Kramer Elementary School, Ben Franklin Middle School, and Hillcrest High School.

== See also ==
The Round House
