= Trini Garza Early College High School =

Senior high school in Dallas, Texas

Coordinates: 32°43′37″N 96°54′12″W

Trinidad "Trini" Garza Early College High School is an early college senior high school in the grounds of Mountain View College in Dallas, Texas. It is a part of the Dallas Independent School District.

It was one of the district's first early college high schools. It was originally named Early College High School at Mountain View College but was given its current name, after Mexican American community advocate and former DISD board member Trinidad "Trini" Garza, in 2010.

== Academic performance ==
From 2015 to 2018 the Texas Education Agency (TEA) gave Garza all seven distinctions for high performance for each year. In the 2016–2017 school year the TEA designated Garza as one of two National Title I Distinguished Schools in the state. In 2017 Garza's state test results in all subjects were 200% of the statewide averages.

== Demographics ==
As of 2018 it had 434 students, with 86% of them were classified as being from low income families. Corbett Smith of The Dallas Morning News characterized the number of the student body as being small. Brandon Leal, a 12th grade (senior) student indirectly and directly quoted in Smith's article, stated that, in Smith's words, the student body size was "fostering a sense of togetherness, with students banding together to help one another meet high expectations of college coursework."
