= Swiss Avenue Historic District =

- U.S. National Register of Historic Places
- U.S. Historic district
- Dallas Landmark
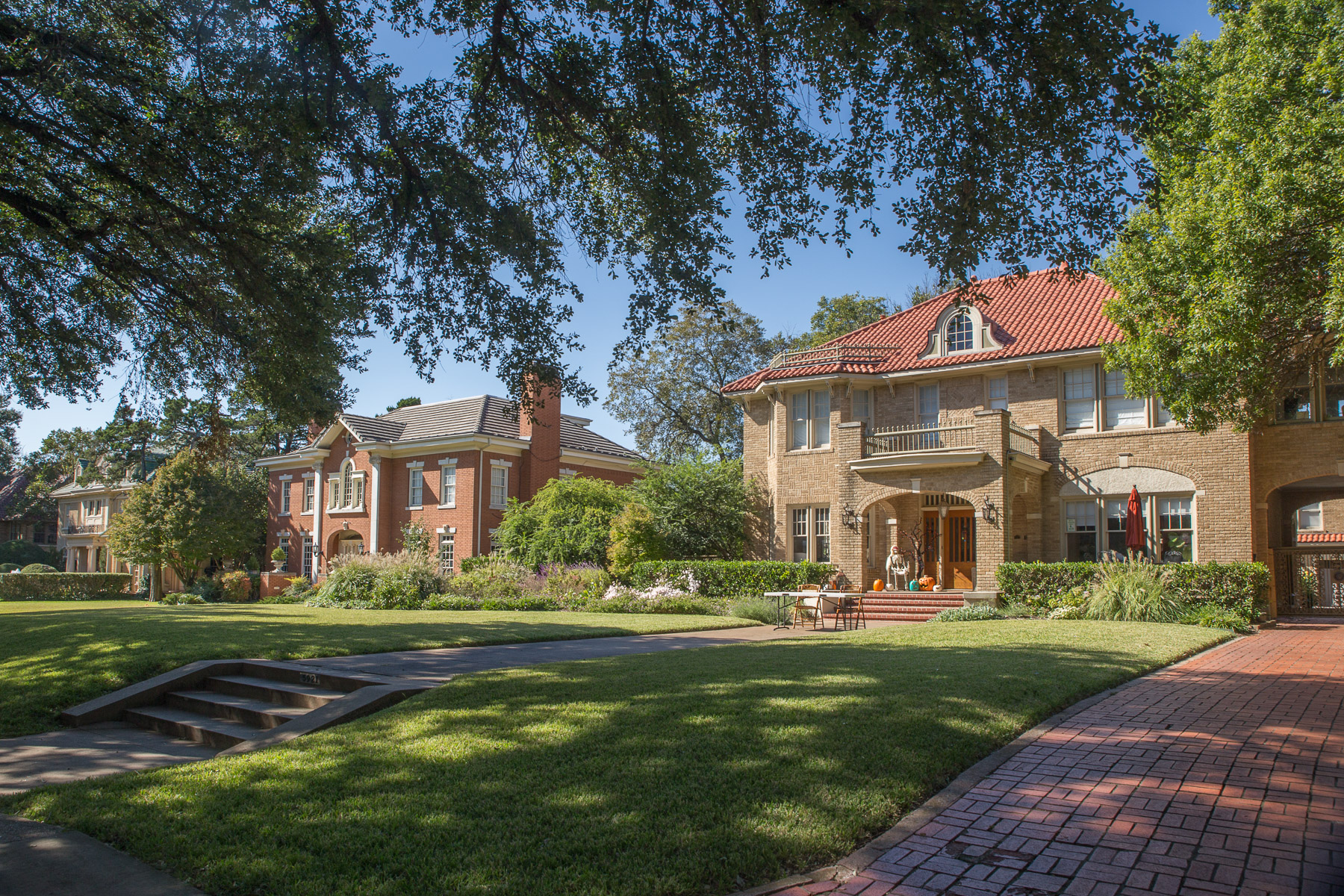
- Swiss Avenue in 2021

- Location within Texas Location within the United States
- Location: Swiss Ave. between Fitzhugh and LaVista, Dallas, Texas
- Coordinates: 32°48′25″N 96°45′49″W
- Area: 57.1 acres (23.1 ha)
- Architect: Multiple
- Architectural style: Colonial Revival, Late 19th and 20th Century Revivals, Prairie School
- Website: Swiss Avenue Historic District
- NRHP reference No.: 74002068
- DLMK No.: H/1

Significant dates
- Added to NRHP: March 28, 1974
- Designated DLMK: July 9, 1973

The Swiss Avenue Historic District is a residential neighborhood in East Dallas, Dallas, Texas (USA). It consists of installations of the Munger Place addition, one of East Dallas' early subdivisions. The Swiss Avenue Historic District is a historic district of the city of Dallas, Texas. The boundaries of the district comprise both sides of Swiss Avenue from Fitzhugh Street, to just north of La Vista, and includes portions of Bryan Parkway. The District includes the 6100-6200 blocks of La Vista Drive, the west side of the 5500 block of Bryan Parkway the 6100-6300 blocks of Bryan Parkway, the east side of the 5200-5300 block of Live Oak Street, and the 4900-6100 blocks of Swiss Avenue. The entire street of Swiss Avenue is not included within the bounds of the Swiss Avenue Historic District. Portions of the street run through Dallas' Peaks Suburban Addition neighborhood and Peak's Suburban Addition Historic District. 5215 Swiss was built in 1914 and was the home of J. P. Cranfield

== Early development ==
Swiss Avenue, at least the portions contained within the Swiss Avenue Historic District, was initially developed by Robert S. Munger, a Dallas cotton gin manufacturer and pioneering real estate developer, as part of a larger development, Munger Place, which was billed as the first deed-restricted community in Texas. Munger had retired from the management of his ginning companies and started working in real estate with his son Collett (for whom Dallas' Collett Avenue is named) in 1902. The subdivision was also one of the first in Dallas to ensure that the front views of homes wouldn't be blocked by utility poles; all utilities were installed through the rear of the lots via alleys. The lots in the Swiss Avenue section of Munger Place were larger than those in other areas of Munger Place, such as on Junius Street, Gaston Avenue, or portions of Worth Street that continue through Munger Place. In order to set off the development from others, Munger had gates erected at the entrances to Gaston Avenue, Swiss Avenue, and Junius Street, major thoroughfares in the development.

The original plat for Munger Place from 1907 showed twenty blocks of Swiss Avenue, Gaston Avenue, Junius Street, Worth Street, and Crutcher Street between Fitzhugh Avenue and Munger Boulevard platted; growth, however, was rapid and lots sold well, and Munger extended the development in 1910 to include the south side of Live Oak Street from Fitzhugh Avenue to Dumas Street and both sides of Swiss Avenue to Parkmont Street.

Seventy-foot lots on Swiss Avenue were being sold for $3,500 in August 1908; by comparison, lots on Junius Street that were 60-foot lots were selling for $2,400 at the same time. In 1978, shortly after the historic district was formed, 5744 Swiss Avenue was marketed for $275,000. Today, homes within the Swiss Avenue Historic District in good or well-remodeled condition routinely sell for over $1 million. Initially, Munger had set aside land for a private drive on the north side of Swiss Avenue, and a part to divide it from the public street on the south. The north side of the street was initially owned by residents, and both sides were intended for their private use. Today, the street and parkway is owned and maintained by the city of Dallas. Like most homes on Swiss Avenue, the community was deed restricted to white buyers only. An early deed to a lot on Swiss Avenue shows also that the front of residences were required to be set back not less than 60 feet nor more than 70 feet from the front line of the lot (the "setback"). Houses or quarters for renting were not allowed, but servant's quarters or stables for the use of the home's residents were allowed.

A trolley initially served the neighborhood, running through what is now the alley between Swiss and Gaston Avenues. Originally, Swiss Avenue was composed of two separate streets, one for public thoroughfare and one for private use, separated by a 40-foot park.

Dr. R. W. Baird is credited as being the first to build on Swiss Avenue in 1905 at 5303 Swiss. He constructed a Classical Revival mansion. In 1910 the surge of building along Swiss Avenue began and, of the approximately 200 homes on the street, the majority of them were constructed during the 1910s and the 1920s.

Swiss Avenue was originally named in 1857, well before serious development, by a Dallas resident from Switzerland. It started out as Swiss Boulevard. It was known as White Rock Road shortly after the Civil War when William H. Gaston purchased 400 acres along the road.

== Deed restrictions drive development ==
The deed restrictions Munger put in place required homes to be a least two stories in height, and constructed on the exterior of brick or masonry. Homes were not permitted to face side streets, and each home had to cost at least $10,000 to build. In other parts of Munger Place, the same $10,000 cost to build applied, but other portions of Munger Place, such as homes on Junius and Worth Streets running through Munger Place, were allowed to be made of wood-sided exteriors.

As a result, very grand homes were built on Swiss Avenue. Architects and builders engaged by prominent Dallasites to build homes on the street included Bertram Hill, Lang & Witchell, Charles Bulger, Hal Thomson, Marion Foshee, C.P. Stiles, Marshall Barnett, W.H. Reeves, Dines & Kraft, and others. Swiss Avenue also boasts being the first paved street in the city of Dallas.

== Heritage designations ==
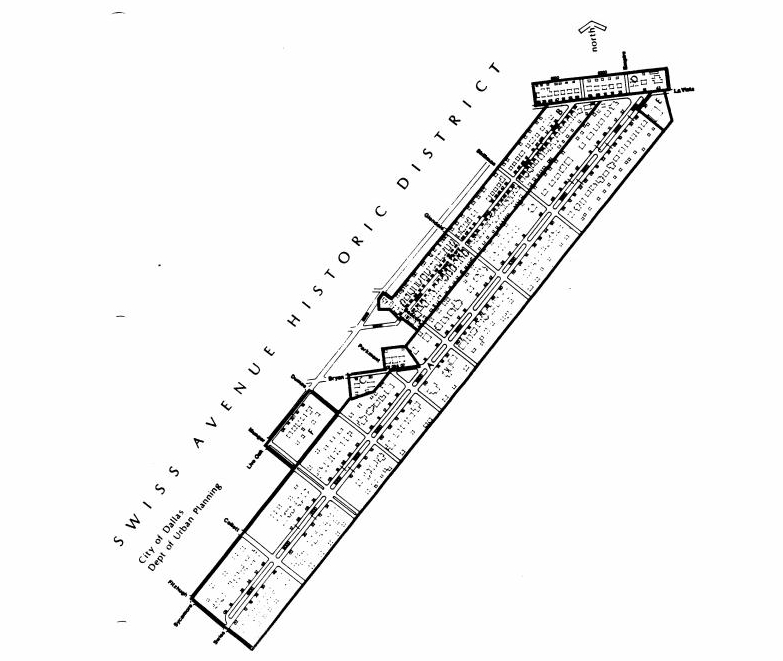
Swiss Avenue Historic District map.

The entire district, Swiss Avenue between Fitzhugh and La Vista, was listed as a historic district on the National Register of Historic Places on March 28, 1974, and is a Dallas Landmark Historic District, the city's first, established in 1973. One home within the district is listed individually on the National Register while several more are designated as Recorded Texas Historic Landmarks.

The Historic Preservation League of Dallas (a forerunner of the non-profit organization Preservation Dallas), with the help of the Dallas Department of Urban Planning, performed the original research for the designations. The National Trust for Historic Preservation initially became aware of the Dallas Preservation League's work through its Department of Field Services in the fall of 1972, and in January of the next year, the preservation league was awarded a $500 grant to retain an architectural historian to conduct an architectural survey of the proposed district. Another matching grant of $800 was provided later to assist the league in hiring legal assistance to challenge a proposal to build a high-rise apartment complex in the district.

According to the National Trust for Historic Preservation's study on the district's founding, getting the historic district ordinance passed was just one of many serious problems facing those seeking to preserve Swiss Avenue. Newspapers referred to the group as, "an unnamed group of interested citizens," which the Trust reports numbered only nine people. Two architects, an audiovisual expert, a freelance writer and journalist, a banker, contractor, and two lawyers were part of the initial group. Many absentee landlords of the Swiss Avenue homes felt that the value of the structures was only in the land, much of which was re-zoned for high-rise apartments.

Once the boundaries of the district and an ordinance covering the historic district were prepared by city staff, the Dallas Historic Landmark Preservation Committee (now the Dallas Landmark Commission), the Dallas City Plan Commission, and the Dallas City Council had to approve the plans and ordinance. The Trust claims that the City Plan department staff actually initiated the idea of the historic district.

== Architectural styles ==
At least 16 architectural styles are visible on Swiss Avenue. These include: Mediterranean, Spanish, Georgian, Prairie, Craftsman, Queen Anne, Jacobethan (English), Neoclassical, Italian Renaissance, Tudor and Colonial Revival.

Frank Lloyd Wright's influence is visible is seen in the R. W. Higginbotham House at 5002 Swiss built in 1913. It was designed Lang and Witchell.

== Homes with individual historic designations ==
These homes within the district are designated individually on the National Register of Historic Places (NRHP) or as Recorded Texas Historic Landmarks (RTHL).

- Aldredge House (RTHL #6586, 1982), 5500 Swiss Ave.—William Newberry Lewis had this residence constructed beginning in 1915. Hal Thompson and Marion Foshee, architects, were responsible for the home's design, which includes features of English Georgian and French Renaissance styling. A Dallas banker, George N. Aldredge, purchased the home in 1921.

- Cristler-Rodgers House (RTHL #6660, 1989), 5750 Swiss Ave.—This home was built in 1923 by Dr. J.H. Cristler. Cristler came to Dallas in 1911 after helping in the organization of Childress County, Texas. Starting in 1938, his daughter Edna and her husband, J. Woodall Rodgers, occupied the home from 1938. J. Woodall Rodgers was Mayor of Dallas from 1939 to 1947.

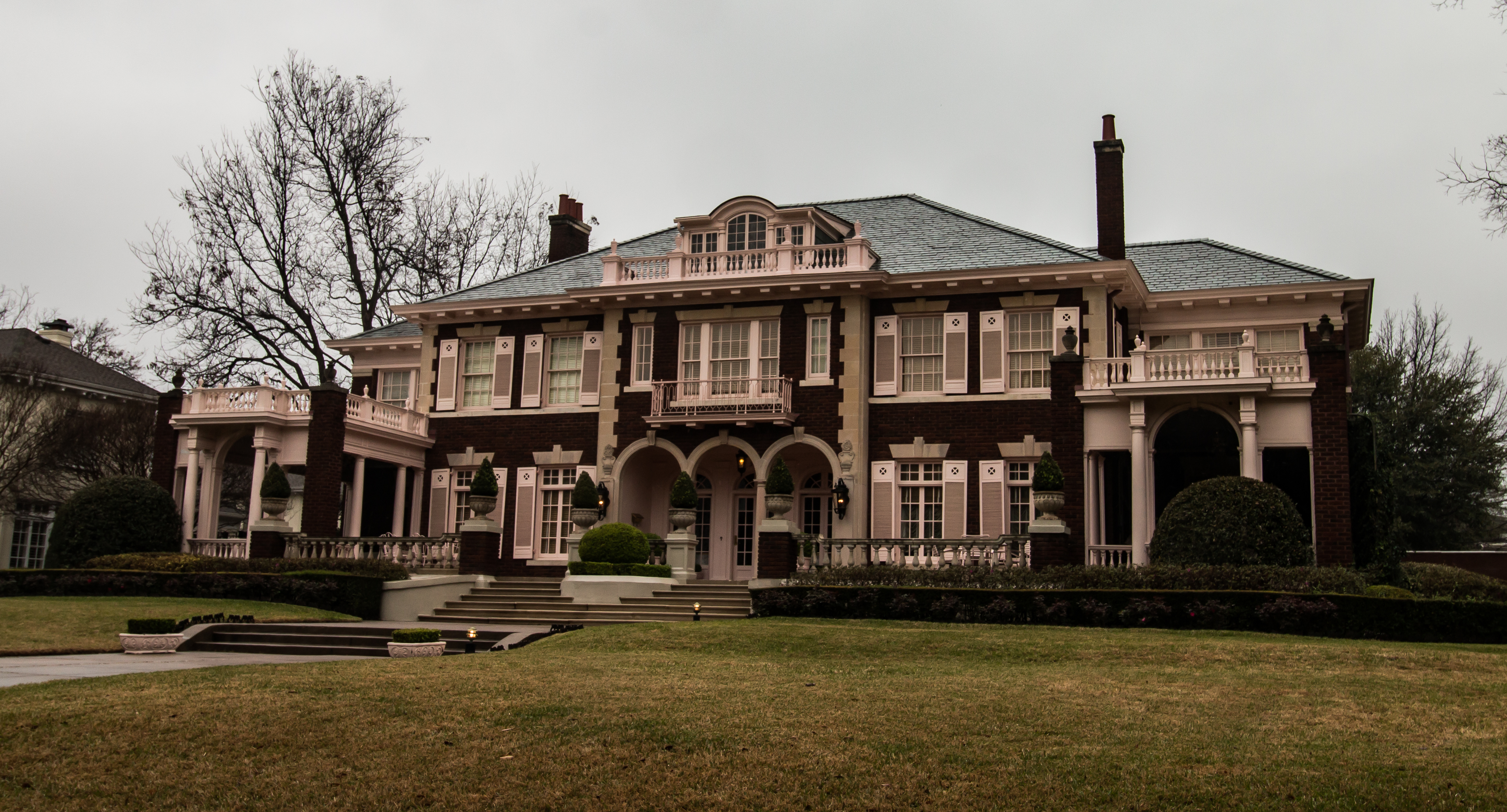
The Greer House is individually listed on the National Register

- George C. Greer House (NRHP #96001563, 1997), 5439 Swiss Ave.—Designed by architect Marion Fresenius Fooshee, the house was listed on the National Register of Historic Places on January 9, 1997.

- Harris-Savage Home (RTHL #17586, 2013), 5703 Swiss Ave.—Constructed in 1917 for P.A. Ritter, later occupants of the home included William A. Turner, a Texas oil field pioneer, and W.R. Harris, who was a prosecutor during the impeachment of Texas Governor James Ferguson by the Texas Legislature, and Wallace Savage, a former mayor of Dallas.

- Robert and Marie Stubbs House (RTHL #12611, 2001), 6243 La Vista Dr.—This home was completed in 1926, and may have been designed by Dallas architect Otto H. Lang. The home was constructed by Robert Campbell Stubbs, who moved to Dallas in 1887 and started a paving business with his father. R.C. Stubbs' died a year after the home was completed and his wife, the former Marie M. Henke, lived there until 1940. The home was converted to apartments but converted back to single-family use in the 1970.

- The Louis Wagner Home (RHTL #6910, 1979), 5320 Live Oak St.—This house was built in 1884 by German immigrant and Dallas businessman Louis Wagner with his wife Anna, the daughter of early Swiss Avenue settler Jacob Pretz. The house was originally located at 2917 Bryan St. but was relocated to the district in 1977 to avoid demolition.

== Other significant and compatible homes ==
The street has been home to many prominent residents of Dallas over the years. The home at 5803 Swiss Avenue was home to Carrie Marcus Neiman, founder of the department store, Neiman Marcus. The home at 5614 Swiss Avenue was home to George F. Gibson, an early pastor of Munger Place Methodist Church and an instructor at Southern Methodist University's Perkins School of Theology. 5417 Swiss was owned by A.J. Langford, an executive with Ford Motor Company. The dining room of the home at 5020 Swiss appeared in the pilot for the television show "Dallas." The 1892 vice presidential candidate for the Prohibition Party, James B. Cranfill, also lived on the street, at 5121 Swiss Avenue.

- 4902 Swiss Ave.—This home was constructed in 1920, for $15,000, and was built for Joseph Schepps, owner of Schepps' Bakery. Dr. John Bourland, an obstetrician and inventor of the incubator for premature infants, moved into the home in 1923.
- 4905 Swiss Ave.—Contrary to popular belief and some historic records, there were homes constructed on Swiss Avenue that were "speculative construction," meaning that a builder built them hoping and planning for someone to buy them. This home was speculative construction, and built for $15,000. It was first occupied by Lyle Marshall. It has Jacobean detailing influences.
- 4938 Swiss Ave.—The original residence on this lot built for furniture store owner M. P. Hawthorne was raised in the 1970s, and a house from Lower Swiss Avenue was relocated to the lot.
- 4946 Swiss Ave.—Known as the "Bishop's House," the home was constructed for Bishop Joseph Patrick Lynch of the Catholic Diocese of Dallas and North Texas. It was constructed in 1913. Bishop Lynch High School is named for the home's longtime occupant.
- 4949 Swiss Ave.—This home was sometimes referred to as the "Queen of Swiss Avenue," and was designed by architect W. H. Reeves and constructed in 1918. J.R. Tennison built the residence for $25,000, and it was later owned by the William W. Caruth family. It was in this home that Mattie Caruth married Harold Byrd.
- 5002 Swiss Ave.—This home was designed by Lang and Witchell and constructed in 1913. It was the residence of R. W. Higgenbotham. It is considered one of the purest examples of Prairie School residential architecture in Dallas.
- 5009 Swiss Ave.—C.C. Weichsel had the original home on this lot constructed for an estimated $20,000 in 1908, on a double-lot purchased for $8,000. Weichsel was chairman of the board of the Dallas National Bank, and later helped organize the Dallas Title and Guarantee Company, and the Great National Life Insurance Company of Dallas. Weichsel willed the home to the Episcopal Diocese of Dallas. The diocese had the home felled.
- 5017 Swiss Ave.—Robert W. Foat, who moved to Dallas to send his children to St. Mary's Episcopal Institute, had this home constructed in 1907. The "sullivanesque friezes and porch capitals are similar to those used at 4409 Swiss Avenue," which is not contained in the Swiss Avenue Historic District.
- 5112 Swiss Ave.—This home was partially destroyed by fire in 1926, and architects Lang and Witchell were called in by owner Clarence R. Miller to completely rebuild the home, which was completed in 1927.
- 5125 Swiss Ave.—This home has many characteristics of Spanish Baroque architecture. W.A. Green of the W. A. Green Department Store was the home's first owner.
- 5215 Swiss Ave.—This home was built for Dr. James B. Cranfill, a medical doctor, ordained Baptist minister, journalist, editor, and politician. He was the Prohibition Party candidate for United States Vice President in 1892. Cranfill walked daily from his Swiss Avenue home to his Downtown Dallas office.
- 5303 Swiss Ave.—A Colonial-style home erected in 1907 by H.E. Jackson and Dr. R. W. Baird.
- 5314 Swiss Ave.—The original owner, Mrs. Edwy Rolfe Brown, alleged that she informed her architects that she wanted a home that looked similar to an Italian Villa because of the suitability of the style to the Dallas Climate. Her husband, E.R. Brown, was chairman of the board of the Magnolia Petroleum Company and vice-president and director of the Socony-Vacuum Company.
- 5400 Swiss Ave.—Collett H. Munger, son of R.S. Munger, and manager of Munger Place, built the home in 1908.
- 5405 Swiss Ave.—Hamilton M. Munger, a farmer and oil man, built this home in 1915, across the street from his brother's home. It shows the influences of both English and Classical styles.
- 5439 Swiss Ave.—This home was initially built in 1916 for George C. Greer, an attorney and president of the Magnolia Petroleum Company. The home was later owned by Currie McCutcheon, a criminal lawyer and former Dallas County Attorney.
- 5614 Swiss Ave.—Again, while many claim there were no speculative construction projects on Swiss Avenue, history has proven this to be untrue. Albert Dines of Dines & Kraft built this home on spec in 1918–1919, and its first occupant was a banker named Napoleon Bonaparte Feagin, with his wife Adline and two sons.
- 5619 Swiss Ave.—This home was constructed in 1918, and is attributed to architect Bertram Hill. It was originally built for E.P. Greenwood, vice president of Great Southwestern Life Insurance Company.
- 5634 Swiss Ave.—This home was constructed for Benjamin H. Stephens, youngest auditor of Cotton Belt Railroad, a founder of Magnolia Oil Company, Director of Standard Oil, technical adviser appointed by President Roosevelt in WWII to the Secretary of the Interior, organizer and chairman of the Board of Directors of Mercantile National Bank, Director of Dallas Federal Savings and Loan and also the Director and on the executive committee of Southwestern Drug.
- 5731 Swiss Ave.—This home was built for Theodore Marcus, later vice president of Neiman Marcus Department Store.
- 5744 Swiss Ave.—This home was built for Hiram Fitzgerald Lively, an attorney and former Dallas County Judge, in 1927. A.J. Rigg was contractor, and the home was built for $27,000. Lively was also an early president of the Dallas Bar Association. Lively served as Dallas County Judge from 1904 to 1908. He was born in Wood County, Texas, and came to Dallas with his parents at age 14. He was an Assistant Dallas County Attorney from 1900 to 1904. At the time of his death, he was the senior member of Lively, Alexander, George & Thuss. He was married to Trixie Green from Thorpe Springs in 1908. He is buried at Grove Hill Memorial Park.
- 5711 Swiss Ave.—Architect Bertram Hill designed this home, built for I.G. Thompson in 1918. Architect Bertram Hill claimed that the central plaque above the door of the home is cast stone relief work combining a shield with ribbon and foliage and was made by an English stonemason.
- 5750 Swiss Ave.—This home was built for Dr. J.H. Cristler for $20,000 in 1923. It exhibits some Spanish Colonial influence, as well as Eclectic elements.
- 5803 Swiss Ave.—The home at 5803 Swiss Avenue was home to Carrie Marcus Neiman, founder of the department store, Neiman Marcus.
- 5908 Swiss Ave.—This home, likely another speculative construction home, was built by D.A. Barnett in the Munger Place Heights addition, and was occupied by Robert H. Coleman, assistant pastor of the First Baptist Church of Dallas, and a widely known songbook publisher.
- 5922 Swiss Ave.—This home was built in 1925. D.A. Barnett was the contractor. The home was first occupied by William H. Shook, a Dallas attorney and former mayor of the city of Rusk, Texas.
- 6017 Swiss Ave.—Designed by architect Bertram Hill, this home was constructed in 1924.
- 6159 La Vista Dr.—This home includes many Romanesque design elements. It was built in 1923.
- 6234 La Vista Dr.—This home was designed by architect Otto Herald (more likely Otto Lang), and constructed in 1925. Its original occupant was R.C. Stubbs, a prominent Dallas concrete contractor. Stubbs held a patent on a process for bonding new concrete to old concrete products.

== Centennial photographs of every home on Swiss Avenue ==
One hundred years after the Munger brothers created Munger Place as the finest residence park in the South Land, all one hundred homes were photographed. This block by block photographic survey of the homes show the preservation and renovation of these architecturally significant homes over one hundred years.

== Modern controversies ==
The Aldredge House, located at 5500 Swiss Avenue, owned by the Dallas Medical Society, was named to Preservation Dallas' 2015 list of “Most Endangered Historic Places.” This is because of an ongoing controversy relating to the zoning of the house allowing it to be used for private events, such as weddings. Preservation Dallas, in naming the house to its list, noted that the home is located in the city's first residential historic district, and is one of architect Hal Thomson's key works in the French Eclectic style featuring Renaissance detailing. Preservation Dallas noted that, while the home isn't threatened with demolition, the removal of the zoning allowing private events to be held at the home would likely mean the home would be required to be sold by its owners, thus closing off to the public historically intact interiors, and subjecting those to modernization.

In 2000, a controversy was created when former Texas Secretary of State David Dean requested to add a 400-foot extension on to his home, including space for a closet. The Dallas Landmark Commission refused to allow Dean to make the addition in August 2000. The Dallas City Council, on October 4, 2000, approved his request. Then-mayor Ron Kirk, later mayor Laura Miller, and Councilman John Loza opposed the request. Council members Leo Chaney, Jr., and Donna Blumer recused themselves from the votes citing unspecified conflicts stemming from their relationships with parties in the dispute. Dean, who later chaired the North Texas Crime Commission, served as counsel to Texas Governors William P. Clements, Jr., and Dolph Briscoe.

In 1997, the Dallas Observer ran a multi-page article discussing an attempted coup d'état of the Swiss Avenue Historic District Association's leadership, and controversies surrounding the Swiss Avenue Women's Guild.

in 1973, the old Terrill Preparatory School home at 4217 Swiss had several mysterious fires, and was a "haven for hippies and transients," and some area residents wanted the house demolished. Also in 1973, a state district judge ordered the city to issue a building permit to a high-rise apartment builder wishing to construct apartments at Swiss Avenue and Collett Streets. The city had denied the permit, because of the expectation that the area was being made into a historic district. The city appealed the case.

== Education ==
Swiss Avenue is within the Dallas Independent School District (DISD).

Almost all residents are zoned to William Lipscomb Elementary School in Junius Heights, J. L. Long Middle School, and Woodrow Wilson High School. A part of a block is zoned to Cesar Chavez Elementary School, Alex W. Spence Middle School, and North Dallas High School.

== See also ==
- National Register of Historic Places listings in Dallas County, Texas
- Recorded Texas Historic Landmarks in Dallas County
- List of Dallas Landmarks
