= Seagoville High School =

School in Dallas, Texas, United States

Location
- 15920 Seagoville Road; Dallas, Texas 75253; United States; 32.677794°N 96.583411°W

Information
- Type: Public, Secondary
- School district: Dallas Independent School District (1964-> Seagoville Independent School District (1928-1964)
- Principal: Katherine Mockler
- Teaching staff: 121.44 (FTE)
- Grades: 9-12
- Enrollment: 1,827 (2023-2024)
- Student to teacher ratio: 15.04
- Colors: Royal Blue and White
- Mascot: Dragon
- Trustee dist.: 4, Nancy Bingham
- Area: 1, Ivonne Durant
- Website: www.dallasisd.org/seagovillehs

Seagoville High School is a public secondary school located in Dallas, Texas, United States, northwest of the city of Seagoville. Seagoville High School enrolls students in grades 9–12 and is a part of the Dallas Independent School District.

Seagoville High School serves the DISD portion of the city of Seagoville, as well as small parts of Dallas (including Kleberg) and the DISD portion of the city of Combine. The community of Wright Farms, located in Dallas, is assigned to Seagoville High School.

In 2015, the school was rated "Met Standard" by the Texas Education Agency.

== History ==
The high school opened in 1928 on land purchased in 1927. In 1929 the school colors and mascot were chosen. Not only was this a school, but the facility also served as a community center. In September 1957 this high school building later burned down, and Central Elementary School opened on the former high school site. The current high school facility and Seagoville Middle School opened on a 22-acre (8.9 ha) plot of land donated by M.D. Reeves in 1952: one building opened in 1955 and the other opened in September 1958. The school was originally in the Seagoville Independent School District but became a part of DISD in August 1964.

In 2008 a series of fights at the school lead the school to declare a lockdown. Afterwards a group of parents expressed fears for the safety of their children to the media.

== School song ==
The school song is "Dear Old Seagoville High", written by Brother William Greenhaw in the 1940s.

== Extracurricular activities and athletics ==
In January 1929 the first school newspaper, Boll Weevil, debuted.

Dan Gross was the first coach of the American football team.

J. M. Skogen, author of On the Hardwood: Portland Trail Blazers, wrote that Seagoville High had "a great sports program".

== Athletics ==
The Seagoville Dragons compete in the following sports:

- Baseball
- Basketball
- Cross Country
- Football
- Golf
- Soccer
- Softball
- Swimming and Diving
- Tennis
- Track and Field
- Volleyball
- Wrestling

== School uniforms ==
Starting in the 2005-2006 school year, Seagoville High School requires all students to wear school uniforms.

The Texas Education Agency specified that the parents and/or guardians of students zoned to a school with uniforms may apply for a waiver to opt out of the uniform policy so their children do not have to wear the uniform; parents must specify "bona fide" reasons, such as religious reasons or philosophical objections.

In September 2008 the high school made national news after the school required Tabitha Ruiz, a student, to remove a rosary given to her by her mother on the grounds that it was a "gang symbol." In 2015 Seagoville High's administration in-school suspended a student who wore an American flag T-shirt to school.

== Feeder patterns ==
As of 2013, elementary schools feeding into Seagoville include Kleberg and Ebby Halliday in Dallas and Central, Seagoville, and Seagoville North in Seagoville. Seagoville Middle School is the only middle school that feeds into Seagoville High School.

== Notable alumni ==
- LaMarcus Aldridge (2004) — former professional basketball player for the Portland Trail Blazers, San Antonio Spurs, and Brooklyn Nets; former college player for the University of Texas and finalist for the John R. Wooden Award for best male college basketball player
- Donald Sloan (2006) — played for Texas A&M and has played professional basketball for various teams
- Moises Hernandez (2010) — professional soccer player for FC Dallas
