= Junius Heights, Dallas =

Neighborhood of Dallas, Texas, USA

Junius Heights
- Neighborhood
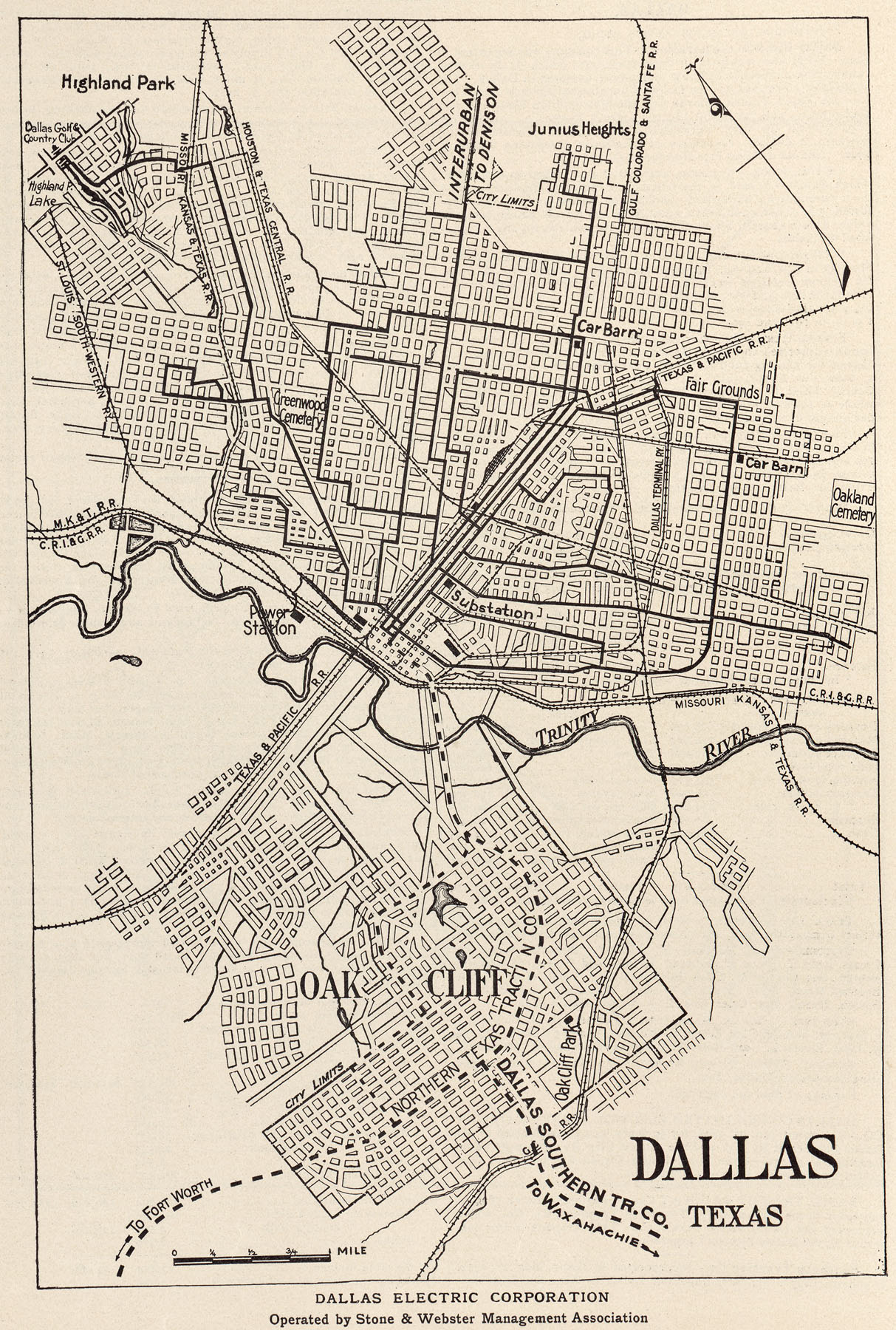
- Map of Junius Heights, Dallas
- Interactive map of Junius Heights
- Coordinates: 32°48′22.28″N 96°45′17.9″W
- Country: United States of America
- State: Texas
- County: Dallas County
- City: Dallas
- Time zone: UTC-6:00 (CST)
  - Summer (DST): UTC-5:00 (CDT)
- Website: www.juniusheights.org

Junius Heights is Dallas' largest historic district, a neighborhood of more than 800 homes in East Dallas, Texas (USA) situated east of Munger Place, south of Swiss Avenue and southwest of Lakewood. It is relatively rectangular, bounded roughly by Gaston Avenue on the NW, Paulus Avenue on the NE, Reiger Avenue on the SE, and Henderson Avenue on the SW.

== Overview and history ==
Junius Heights was built at what was the eastern edge of the city of Dallas in the late 1910s and construction continued into the 1930s. Most of the houses are Craftsman and Prairie style bungalows with a smattering of other styles. The neighborhood was served by the Junius Heights streetcar line until streetcar service was discontinued in Dallas.

The neighborhood was cut in two in the early 1970s when Abrams Road was extended from Junius St. to connect with Columbia Ave. The landmark Junius Heights columns were moved at the same time. The original plan called for them to be demolished but a neighborhood effort resulted in them being moved instead.

In 2006 the community became known as a historic district.

In 2010 Junius Heights was named "Best Place for Families" during its listing on This Old House's "Best Old House Neighborhoods 2010".

== Composition ==
Most residences are single family houses with most constructed in the period 1906–1940. In 2011 some houses were recently constructed. In 2011 Dawn McMullan of D Magazine wrote that the "city within a city" vibe in East Dallas is "even more so in Junius Heights because of its proximity to restaurants and retail."

== Demographics ==
As of 2011 it had about 700 families.

== Landmarks ==
Landmarks in and near Junius Heights include:
• the Lakewood Theater and Lakewood shopping center outside the northern tip of the neighborhood
• the Lakewood branch of the Dallas Public Library at Abrams Rd. and Worth St., adjacent to the district
• Woodrow Wilson High School (Official Dallas Landmark, State of Texas Historical Marker, recognition by the National Trust for Historic Preservation) at Columbia Ave. and Glasgow St., near the district
• J.L. Long Middle School on the Woodrow Campus (City of Dallas Landmark)
• Lipscomb Elementary School at Worth and Lowell Sts.
• Junius Heights Baptist Church at Reiger Ave. and Augusta St.
• St. John Methodist Church at Beacon and Columbia Aves.
• Juliette Fowler Communities at Abrams Rd. and Reiger Avenue, and
• a small commercial center at Junius St. and Henderson Ave.

== Education ==
The neighborhood is served by the Dallas Independent School District (DISD). Residents are zoned to William Lipscomb Elementary School (grades PK-5), J.L. Long Middle School, and Woodrow Wilson High School.

Lipscomb is inside the Junius Heights Historic District, and Woodrow Wilson is adjacent to the historic district. Dallas Public Library operates the Lakewood Public Library, which is also inside the historic district.

In addition to Junius Heights, Lipscomb also serves Munger Place and Swiss Avenue. By 2008 DISD made the school only serve grades K to 3, with grades 4 and 5 from the Lipscomb zone assigned to Mata Elementary. By that year parents campaigned for the return of grades 4 and 5 to Lipscomb. In 2008 Lipscomb began serving the 4th grade. As of 2019 Lipscomb now serves all elementary grades.

Mata, now Eduardo Mata Montessori School, a K-8 school, gives second admission priority to people zoned to Woodrow Wilson High. Therefore, Junius Heights is one of the neighborhoods with priority for the school.
