= Kleberg, Dallas =

Area of Dallas, Texas, U.S.

Coordinates: 32.6721°N 96.6157°W

Kleberg (/ˈkleɪbɜːrɡ/ KLE-burg) is an area in southeastern Dallas, Texas, United States that was formerly an unincorporated community in Dallas County.

== History ==
In 1956 Kleberg incorporated as a city. By 1970, Kleberg had 4,510 people and three businesses made their homes in Kleberg. By 1978 Kleberg was the largest town in Texas with no property tax. On April 3, 1978 the city was annexed by the City of Dallas.

== Government and infrastructure ==
Fire Station 9 of the Dallas Fire Department, serving Kleberg, opened on April 1, 1978. Before then the building served as the Kleberg City Hall, the Kleberg Police Department station, and the Kleberg Volunteer Fire Department station. In 1989 the fire station moved into a new building.

The United States Postal Service operates what was once the Kleberg Post Office at 15300 Seagoville Road. It has been renamed the Seagoville Post Office as of April 8, 2011. The smaller post office in Seagoville located at 314 Glendale Ave was permanently closed; it was scheduled for closure after October 31, 2011 when it reaches the end of their current three-month lease on the building.

== Education ==
Kleberg is in Dallas Independent School District. Zoned schools include Kleberg Elementary School, Seagoville Middle School, and Seagoville High School.

Kleberg was absorbed into the Seagoville Independent School District in the late 1940s-early 1950s period, and it in turn became a part of DISD in August 1964.

Dallas Public Library operates the Kleberg-Rylie Branch Library at 1301 Edd Road.

== Parks and recreation ==
The Kleberg-Rylie Community Center, operated by Dallas Parks, serves the community.
