= Judge Barefoot Sanders Law Magnet =

Location
- 1201 East Eighth Street; Dallas, Texas 75203; United States
- 32.7522°N 96.8067°W

Information
- Type: Public, Secondary
- Motto: Read. Write. Think.
- School district: Dallas Independent School District
- Principal: Michael Jones
- Grades: 9-12
- Enrollment: 457
- Trustee District: 5, Lew Blackburn
- Website: www.dallasisd.org/lawmagnet

The Yvonne A. Ewell Townview Magnet Center Seal

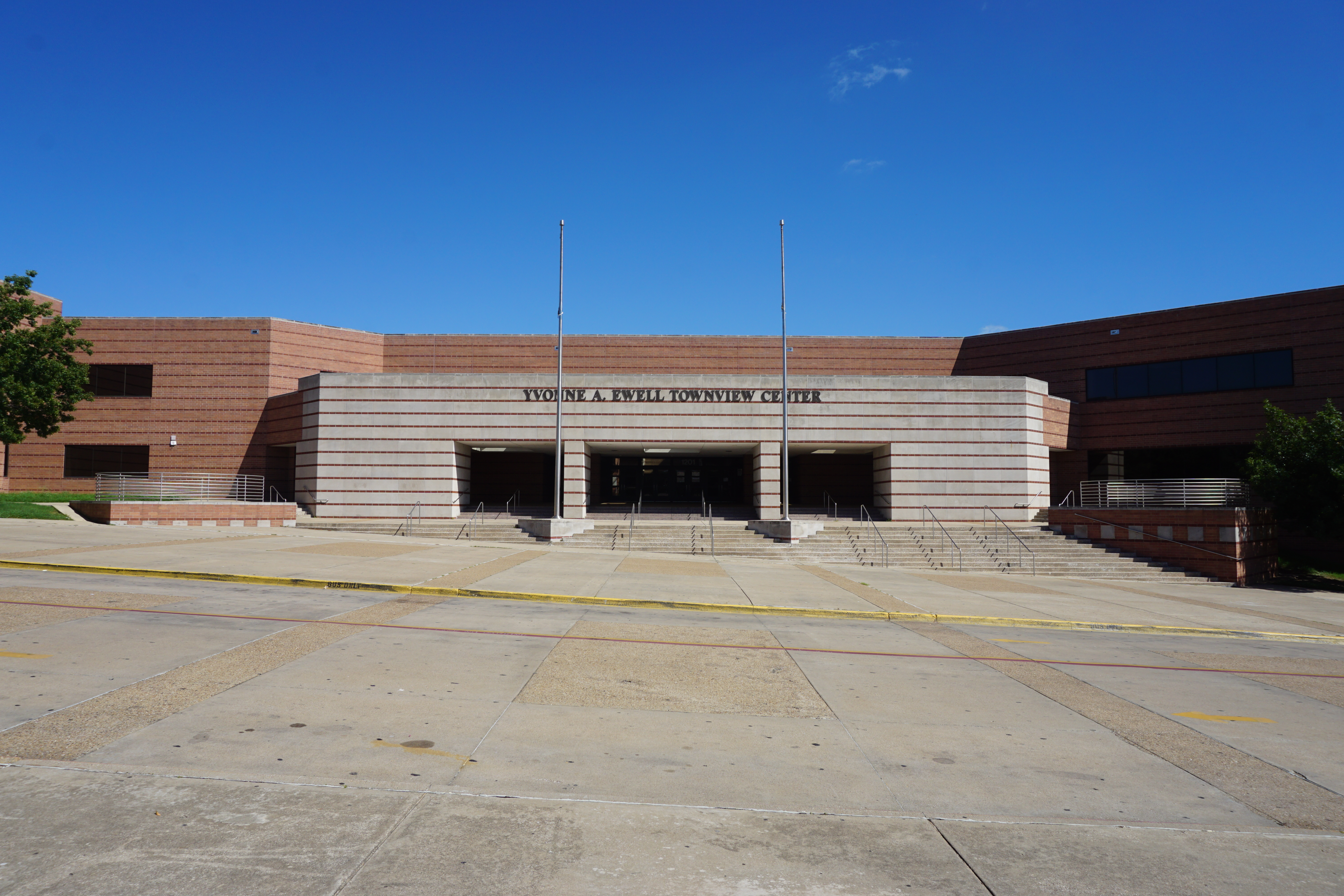
Yvonne A. Ewell Townview Magnet Center, which houses this school

The Judge Barefoot Sanders Law Magnet is a Dallas Independent School District (DISD) magnet high school located in Dallas, Texas. Formerly the School of Government, Law, and Law Enforcement, it is a part of the Yvonne A. Ewell Townview Magnet Center. The school was renamed in honor of Judge Barefoot Sanders in 2009. Students and faculty refer to the school as the Law Magnet. The Law Magnet allow students to explore careers in government, law, and law enforcement. The school has three pathways: Criminal Justice, Government, and Pre-Law. Students have the option to enroll in the pathway of their choice upon enrolling in the school. The school provides students with a range of experiential learning activities, including project-based learning in the classroom, courtroom observations, and internships. These learning opportunities let students engage with local government, legal professions, and law enforcement in a variety of settings.

== History ==
The Judge Barefoot Sanders Law Magnet is the product of a landmark desegregation lawsuit initiated in the 1970s. The lawsuit, brought by Sam Tasby and others, sought to desegregate the Dallas Independent School District using the ruling from the Supreme Court case of Brown v. Board of Education of Topeka in 1954. This case, generally regarded as one of the most consequential in American history, declared state laws establishing separate public schools for black and white students to be unconstitutional.

The Supreme Court's ruling in the Brown v. Board case was fiercely resisted in much of the South and Dallas was no exception. The city's schools remained de facto segregated until the 1970s.

Using the precedent set by the Brown v. Board case, United States District Judge William M. Taylor ordered Dallas Independent School District (DISD) leaders to develop a plan to fully desegregate the Dallas school system. Judge Barefoot Sanders, a seasoned United States District Judge and legal counsel to President Lyndon B. Johnson, later took over Tasby's initial desegregation lawsuit. He developed a desegregation plan for the district and, in 1983, the Dallas school board agreed to implement it. Judge Sanders oversaw the slow transformation of DISD. The district remained under federal oversight until he declared it officially desegregated in 2003.

A major element of Sanders' desegregation plan for DISD was the creation of four magnet schools. The Law Magnet was created in 1977 and was originally combined with the School of Education and Social Services (Rosie M. Sorrells School of Education & Social Services). Judge Sanders later signed an order commanding the Townview Magnet Center be created to house the DISD magnet programs. However, it was not until 1995 that the Law Magnet and the five other DISD magnet programs were consolidated at the Yvonne A. Ewell Townview Magnet Center. They have remained there ever since.

During the summer of 2009, the DISD Board of Trustees renamed the Law Magnet the Judge Barefoot Sanders Law Magnet, in recognition of Judge Sanders' accomplishments in the field of civil rights and his significant impact on the city of Dallas. The formal naming ceremony was held on October 27, 2009.

Today, the Law Magnet honors Judge Sanders' intentions and is a model of an inclusive school, where all students—regardless of background—are given an opportunity to flourish and succeed.

== Co-curricular activities ==
Although the Law Magnet does not offer competitive sports, (students have the option of competing under their local area high school), the school has a wide selection of competitive academic co-curricular activities. These include, but are not limited to:

- Debate
- Link Crew
- Mock Trial
- SkillsUSA
- Model UN
- The Legal Pad

== Alumni ==
Notable alumni have attended respectable institutions of higher education such as: Brown, University of Chicago, Columbia University, Cornell, Georgetown, Harvard University, MIT, Notre Dame, UPenn, Princeton University, Smith, SMU, Stanford, The University of Texas, Texas A&M, Wellesley, and Yale.

Many alumni of the school have gone on to become lawyers and federal law enforcement professionals.

== Awards ==
2023 - Magnet Schools of America School of Excellence Winner for Merit. National merit awards are given to magnet schools that demonstrate a commitment to high academic standards, curriculum innovation, successful desegregation and diversity efforts, and strong parent and community involvement.

2023 - Dr. Nolan Estes Leadership Ascension Award: Principal Garet Feimster. The University of Texas at Austin College of Education recognizes educational leadership for their commitment to excellence.

2022 - National Judicial Competition (NJC) Mock Trial National Champions. The National Judicial Competition (NJC) is an annual competition for high school student participants in the model judicial components (Appellate and Mock Trial) of the YMCA Youth and Government program. Each Youth and Government state program selects students from their state to compete in either the Appellate or Mock Trial competitions at NJC.

2022 - National Association for Urban Debate Leagues Coach of the Year Finalist (Top 5): Mary Gregg. NAUDL is a Chicago-based non-profit organization that prepares low-income students of color to succeed in college and in their future careers by organizing and supporting competitive debate teams in urban public schools across the country.

2021 - Dallas Independent School District Teacher of the Year: Yonathan Tadesse. Dallas ISD celebrates teaching excellence by recognizing outstanding educators who are making a difference in the lives of students every day.

2019 - National Blue Ribbon Schools Program Recipient: The U.S. Department of Education recognized 362 schools as National Blue Ribbon Schools for 2019 based on their overall academic excellence or their progress in closing achievement gaps among student subgroups. These schools demonstrate that all students can achieve to high levels.

2019 - Terrel Bell Award for Outstanding Leadership Finalist (Top 30): Principal Garet Feimster. The Terrel H. Bell Award recognizes outstanding school leaders and the vital role they play in guiding students and schools to excellence, frequently under challenging circumstances.

The Law Magnet is currently ranked 41st in the Challenge Index, the oldest method for the statistical ranking of top public and private high schools in the United States, created by the Washington Post columnist Jay Mathews.

The Law Magnet is currently ranked 48th in nationally, sixth among Texas High Schools, and fourth in Dallas by U.S. News & World Report.

== Principals ==
A list of past Law Magnet principals:

- Michael Jones, February 2023 to present
- Garet Feimster, June 2016 to December 2022
- Michael Dang, August 2015 to June 2016
- Dina Townsend (interim), June 2014 to August 2015
- Anthony Palagonia, March 2008 to June 2014
- Lucy Livingston (interim), August 2007 to March 2008
- Robert L. Giesler, July 1993 to July 2007
- Daryl Chambers, August 1984 to June 1993
- John Marshall, June 1980 to July 1984
- John Tudor, August 1978 to June 1980
