= Mike Miles (school superintendent) =

American educator

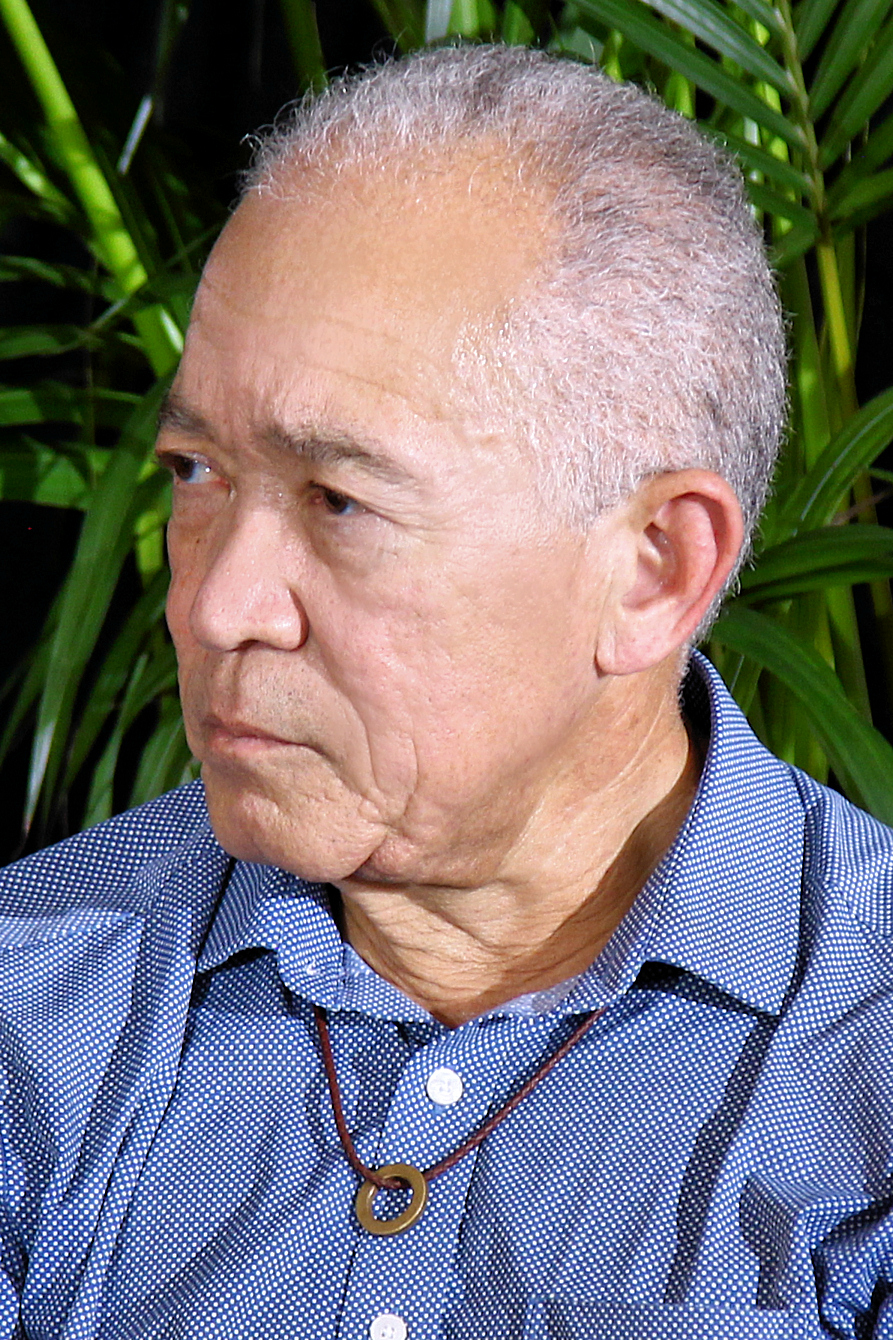
- Miles in 2023

Superintendent of the Houston Independent School District
- Incumbent
- Assumed office June 1, 2023
- Preceded by: Millard House

Superintendent of the Dallas Independent School District
- In office 2012–2015
- Preceded by: Alan King (interim)
- Succeeded by: Michael Hinojosa

Superintendent for Harrison School District 2
- In office 2006–2012
- Preceded by: Victor J. Meyers
- Succeeded by: Andre Spencer

Military service
- Branch/service: United States Army

F. Mike Miles is the current appointed superintendent of Houston Independent School District. He previously served as the superintendent of the Dallas Independent School District (DISD) from July 1, 2012 to June 25, 2015, and previously in Colorado Springs.

Miles was a ranger in the United States Army and worked in the U.S. State Department. In his educational career he served as a superintendent for Harrison School District 2 in Colorado Springs. Miles operated an educational consulting firm called Focal Point while in that position. The business wound down after he became Dallas ISD superintendent as his contract for DISD restricted his outside activities. In Colorado Springs he tied teacher and principal pay to gains in student achievement.

== Dallas Independent School District ==
Miles created the reform effort Destination 2020 which asked for improvements to be made by 2013 and 2015. Another plan, "Accelerating Campus Excellence" (ACE) involved moving new principals and teachers into campuses and attracting high-performing teachers to needy campuses.

Dallas County Commissioner John Wiley Price criticized Miles and called for his ouster.

In 2013 the school board voted on whether to remove Miles from his position. Five members voted against and three voted for. Miles' family initially moved from Colorado Springs to Dallas, but they returned to Colorado Springs in 2013 as a result of media attention on Miles' career.

In 2014 Miles expressed a desire to get additional compensation in his contract. Miles attempted to get amendments to his Dallas ISD contract but the board did not approve them. Miles resigned from Dallas ISD in 2015.

== Post-Dallas ISD ==
=== Third Future Schools ===
After Miles resigned from Dallas ISD, he founded a new chain of charter schools based in Colorado called Third Future Schools. Third Future Schools consists of 11 public charter schools in Colorado, Texas, Louisiana, and Tennessee. In 2024, Spectrum News reported that Miles funneled millions of dollars of Texas public school funding to his Colorado-based charter school network, prompting an investigation by the Texas Education Agency. With no physical space, Colorado staffers as bank account signatories, and substantial administrative leadership coming from Colorado, the nonprofit entity Third Future Schools-Texas formed in 2020 was described as a possible shell corporation. More than $2 million was sent from Third Future Schools-Texas to offset deficits in Colorado. Mike Morath, who appointed Miles as superintendent of HISD, explained that Third Future Schools is not considered a Texas charter school and receives funding through performance contracts with school districts. The Texas Education Agency ruled that Third Future Schools did not violate any applicable Texas laws by sending money to Colorado and chose to take no action.

Third Future Schools’ 2023 audit shows of the $25 million public tax dollars being spent on Miles’ three Texas schools, $15 million was spent on teachers and supplies. The other $10 million, about 40% of the budget, was spent on unspecified administrative costs and services.

=== Houston Independent School District ===
On June 1, 2023, Miles was appointed superintendent of Houston ISD, replacing Millard House II as part of the Houston Independent School District takeover by the Texas Education Agency.

Miles had a controversial first term as superintendent. Issues protested included a lack of autonomy with teacher observations, pushing to convert libraries into discipline areas, HISD employee terminations, and accusations of misuse of funds. Protests occurred at Houston City Hall and multiple HISD schools. HISD has seen significant staff turnover since Miles' appointment, with more than 10,000 employees leaving as of June 2024. In August 2023, his administration sought various policy changes to increase Miles' authority, including an increase in the purchasing threshold requiring board approval from $100,000 to $2 million. In response to significant pushback, the approval threshold was reduced to $1 million and approved by the board of managers. In January 2025, HISD revealed that the administration made $870 million in purchases between August 2023 and December 2024 without seeking proper board approval.

Educational offices
Preceded by Millard House	Houston Independent School District superintendent 2023-	Succeeded by Incumbent
Preceded by Alan King (interim)	Dallas Independent School District superintendent 2012-2015	Succeeded by Michael Hinojosa
Preceded by Victor J. Meyers	Harrison School District 2 superintendent 2006-2012	Succeeded by Andre Spencer
