= Yvonne A. Ewell Townview Magnet Center =

Location
- 1201 East Eighth Street; Dallas, Texas 75203; United States; 32.7522°N 96.8068°W

Information
- Type: Public, secondary
- Founded: 1995
- School district: Dallas Independent School District
- Grades: 9-12
- Trustee dist.: 5, Lew Blackburn

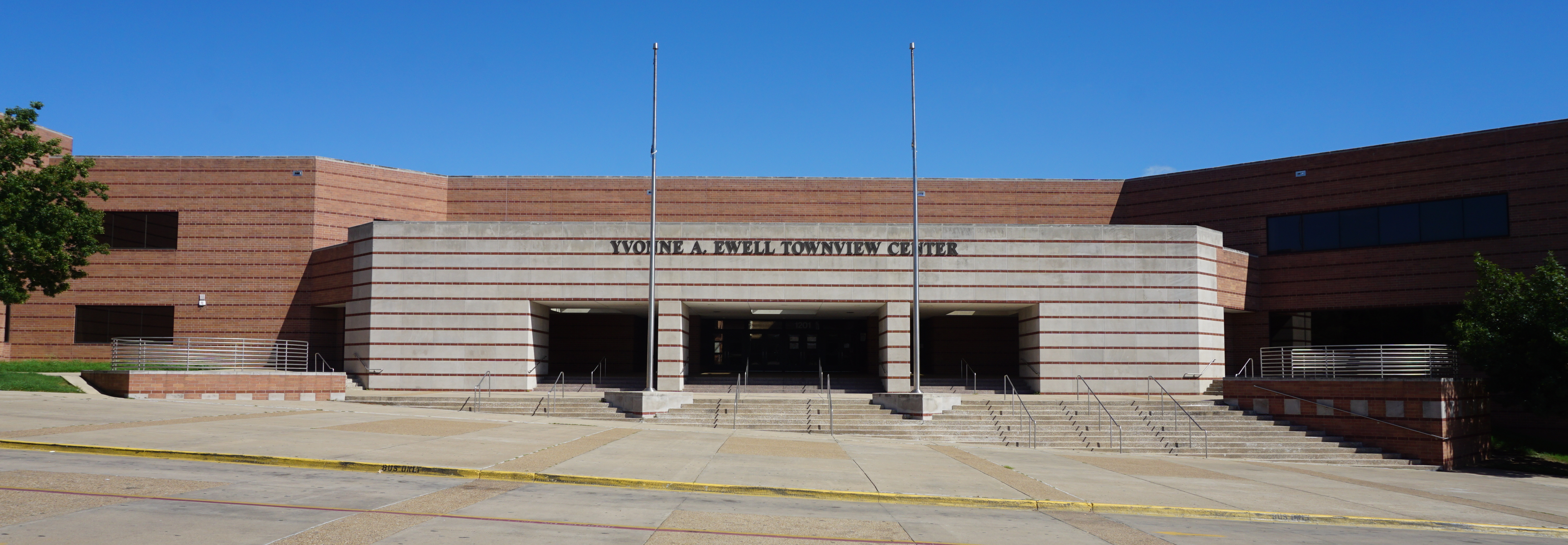
Main entrance

The Yvonne A. Ewell Townview Magnet Center (TMC) is a magnet school in East Oak Cliff, Dallas, Texas, United States. The school names reflects the view of downtown Dallas.

TMC is a three-story building campus that houses six independent magnet high schools in the Dallas Independent School District. The six component schools are:

- The School for the Talented & Gifted (TAG)
- The School of Science and Engineering (SEM)
- The School of Government, Law, & Law Enforcement (LAW)
- The School of Business and Management (SBM)
- The School of Education and Social Services (ESSM)
- The School of Health Professions (HSHP)

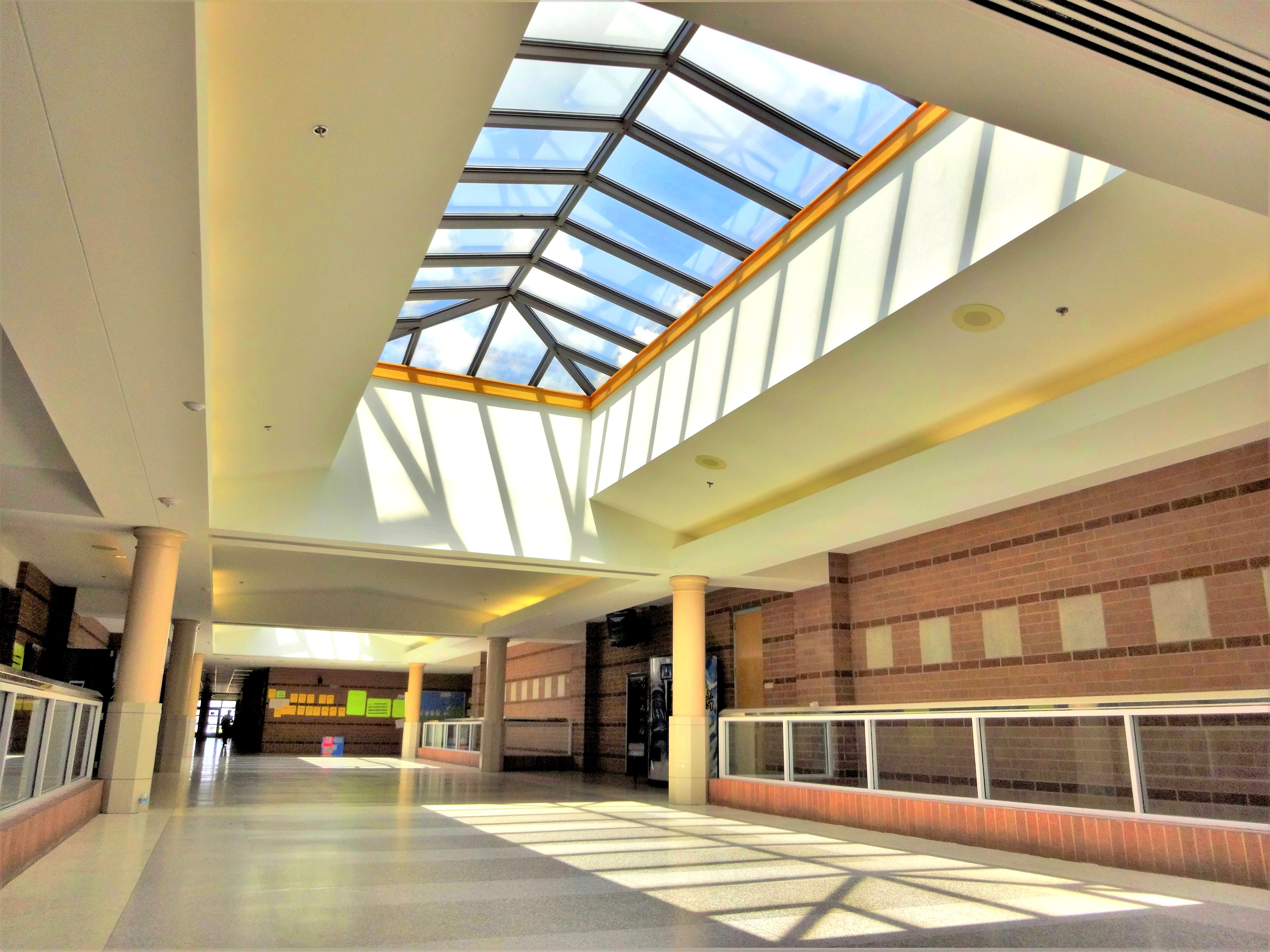
Skylight view of one of the main hallways inside Yvonne A. Ewell Townview Magnet Center

== History ==
DISD superintendent Linus Wright first proposed creating Townview in 1978 as a way to save costs; having a centrally located magnet center would reduce transportation costs. U.S. federal judge Barefoot Sanders, involved in desegregating DISD, supported the plan. Yvonne Ewell and one other DISD administrator were tasked with developing the center, and Ewell helped obtain 26-acre (11 ha) of land in East Oak Cliff. The center was named after her; she retired from DISD in 1984. An economic downturn in 1987 stymied a DISD real estate scheme to sell Crozier Tech High School, and this in turn prevented the originally planned summer 1987 opening for Townview. As of 1992 the proposed cost estimate for Townview was $30 million. In 1992 Sanders allowed the district to scale back its plans for Townview, but he also ordered it to be completed by 1995.

Laura Miller, then writing for the Dallas Observer, stated that there was a lot of buildup in regards to Townview helping solve racial segregation issues in DISD, and also that there was a sense of sacrifice from landowners in Oak Cliff, many of whom were low income and elderly, who gave up their land for Townview.

As Townview was developed there were controversies over what role the principals of the individual magnets would have relative to that of the head of Townview, as well as designs over the curriculum and instruction of those in the individual magnets.

== School distinction ==
In 2006, 2007, 2009, and 2010 Newsweek named the School for the Talented and Gifted the #1 public high school in the United States.

In 2012, 2013, 2014, 2015 and 2016, U.S. News & World Report named School for the Talented and Gifted the #1 public high school in the United States.

The School of Science and Engineering is a blue ribbon school, and also regularly appear among the top schools in Newsweek and the U.S. News & World Report's rankings.

Rosie M. Collins Sorrells School of Education and Social Services is also a blue ribbon school. The School of Business and Management has a bank, radio station and other student activities. Superintendent of the Dallas Independent School District Mike Miles has visited the School of Business and Management due to its tremendous effort.
