= School for the Talented and Gifted =

School for the Talented & Gifted

Location
- 1201 East Eighth Street; Dallas, Texas 75203; United States; 32.752167°N 96.806836°W

Information
- Type: Public, Secondary
- Motto: Be Interested. Be interesting.
- Founded: 1982
- School district: Dallas Independent School District
- Principal: Arnold Zuñiga
- Faculty: 17
- Grades: 9-12
- Enrollment: 256 (2015-16)
- Colors: Blue and Yellow
- Mascot: Griffin
- USNWR ranking: No. 6 (2020)
- Trustee dist.: 5, Lew Blackburn
- Website: TAG Magnet

The School for the Talented and Gifted at the Yvonne A. Ewell Townview Magnet Center (commonly referred to as TAG or TAG Magnet) is a public college preparatory magnet secondary school located in the Oak Cliff area of Dallas, Texas. The school enrolls students in grades 9-12 and is a part of the Dallas Independent School District. It is known for its liberal arts, Advanced Placement, and intensive education style. In 2006, 2007, 2009, and 2010 Newsweek named the school the #1 public high school in the United States. In 2012, 2013, 2014, 2015 and 2016, U.S. News & World Report named TAG the #1 public high school in the United States.

In 2015, the school was rated "Met Standard" by the Texas Education Agency.

== History ==
Yvonne A. Ewell Townview Center Seal

The School for the Talented and Gifted was established in 1982 as part of a desegregation court order and was originally located in West Dallas on the L.G. Pinkston High School campus. Its curriculum was designed to provide a comprehensive academic program to serve identified talented and gifted students in grades nine through twelve.

In the 1990s, the Dallas Independent School District allocated money for a new "magnet center" as an experiment in accelerated high school education. This magnet center would house six different schools, each offering college-preparatory and pre-professional programs alongside a solid academic education. The TAG Magnet, along with five other magnet schools, moved to the new Yvonne A. Ewell Townview Magnet Center in the fall of 1995. Initially, TAG students were taught alongside the students at the other magnet schools, TAG instruction was cut from seven classes to three, and TAG teachers from thirteen to four. After a TAG protest that included petitions, letters to the newspaper, pleas to the school board, and walk-outs, TAG was given an increased number of self-contained classes and permission to have its own teaching staff specialized in teaching talented and gifted students.

== Campus ==
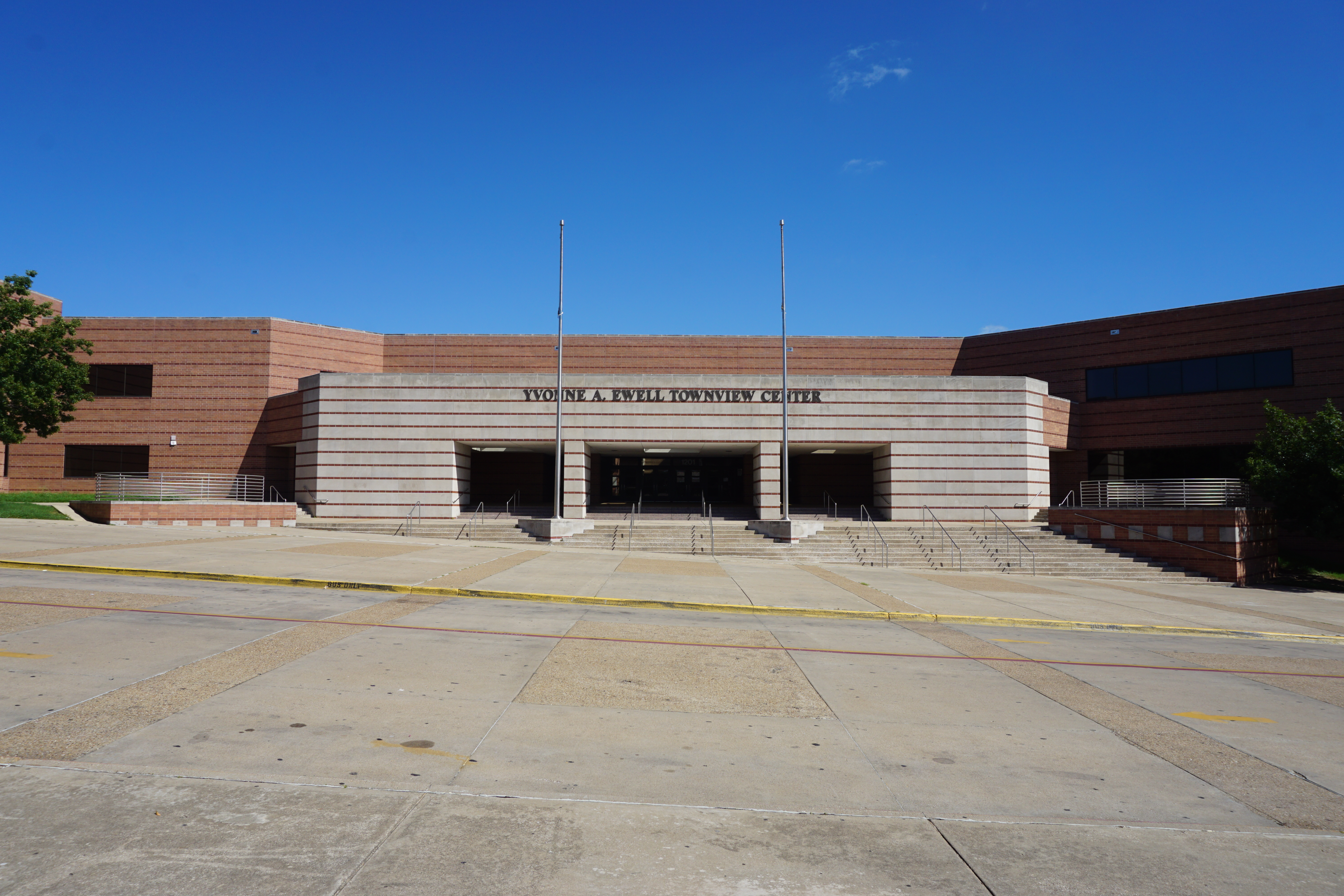
Yvonne A. Ewell Townview Magnet Center, which houses this school

The School for the Talented and Gifted is primarily housed in the south section on the third floor of the Yvonne A. Ewell Townview Magnet Center, with some classrooms distributed across the building.

== Students ==
During the spring semester a screening process is initiated to place incoming students drawn from across the Dallas Independent School District at the TAG Magnet for the following year. A holistic, case-study approach is used by the screening committee, which is composed of the principal, the counselor, teachers, and community representatives. Multiple identification criteria are used in the screening process including academic transcripts, TAKS/ITBS scores, a behavioral assessment, student portfolio, and anecdotal information. Careful attention is paid to pre-established guidelines to ensure that the student population is ethnically balanced.

In the 2010–2011 school year there were 240 students enrolled, and the racial/ethnic makeup reflected the culturally diverse fabric of the larger school district as best as it could following the desegregation rulings of Judge Barefoot Sanders that required "improved programs for minority students and hiring goals for minority faculty and administration staff". The student population was 10.8% Asian/Pacific Islander, 16.7% Black, 30.0% Hispanic, and 42.5% White. The school's gender makeup was not reflective of the larger school district, with 35% boys and 65% girls.

The attendance rate for students at the school is 97.6%, compared with a state average of 95.5%. Of the 201 students at TAG 28.9% are economically disadvantaged, 0% enroll in special education, 100% enroll in gifted and talent programs, and 0% are considered "limited English proficient".

The average class sizes at TAG used to be 14.8 students for English, 5.2 for foreign language, 13.7 for math, 16.4 for science, and 16.8 for social studies but have since increased to about 20.

== Faculty ==
During the 2006–2007 school year the TAG faculty consisted of 17 teachers with an average of 18.2 years of teaching experience and 11.9 years of experience teaching in DISD. Of those teachers, 1.1% are beginning teachers, 18.6% have 1–5 years of experience, 24.1% have 6–10 years of experience, 20.6% have 11–20 years of experience and 35.6% have more than 20 years of experience.

== Curriculum ==
The School for the Talented and Gifted requires the Advanced High School Program as described by the Texas Education Agency (TEA) – this program is entitled the Distinguished Achievement Program (DAP), and it is the highest graduation program for Texas.

The school then takes that program and makes it more demanding by including the Pre-AP and AP curriculum.

=== English curriculum ===
A typical TAG student takes English 1 Pre-AP as a freshman, English 2 Pre-AP as a sophomore, AP English Language and Composition as a junior, and AP English Literature and Composition as a senior. The Texas Education Agency mandated that all TAG students in Texas must submit an “Exit-Level Project” during their senior year. This project requires finding a mentor in the community, researching and developing the project, and submitting the finished project to a set of judges at the state level. The projects are graded on a “1” to “5” scale, with “5” being the highest. The student must score a “3” or higher to graduate with a “TAG” endorsement on their diploma. TAG's Independent Study English course is this exit-level project. In addition to the required courses, students have choices of the following electives: Debate and Humanities (World Studies/Philosophy).

Since there is a selection process used to gain admission to the TAG Magnet; and, since one of the definitions of a TAG student is a national-norm reading score of “80” or higher, the school does not have students who read below grade level. However, since TAG requires an AP course (AP Human Geography) as freshman, the school does have students who do not read well enough to tackle a college-level course in their first year of high school. These students are referred to the Student Support Team (SST) for review. This leads to a parent-teacher-student conference attended by both the counselor and the principal. Parent, student, and teacher agree to work together as they check on progress achieved through tutoring before and after school. In some cases, additional projects are assigned to improve reading skills.

=== Math curriculum ===
Because the TAG admissions process is selective- one of the definitions of a TAG student is a national-norm math score of “82” or higher- a TAG student enters the school having already taken Algebra.

Typically, the majority of the class takes Geometry their freshman year. As an effect, students take Algebra 2 Pre-AP as sophomores, Pre-Calculus and AP Statistics as juniors, and AP Calculus AB as seniors. Students who enter the school without Algebra I credits will take both Algebra I and Geometry Pre-AP as freshman and then follow the aforementioned track until their senior year. If a student who has had both Algebra I and Geometry in their 7th and 8th grade years begins their math curriculum at TAG with Algebra II, they continue on to take Pre-Calculus as a sophomore, AP Calculus AB and AP Statistics as a junior, and AP Calculus BC as a senior.

Other students choose to "fast track" their math courses taking Algebra 2 Pre-AP and Pre-Calculus Pre-AP as sophomores thus allowing them to take AP Calculus BC as seniors. The school does allow those advanced students to do take an elective called independent study in math, which teaches number theory and linear algebra, as well as other topics they will encounter at the university level.

== Awards ==
- TAG was ranked the #1 high school in the United States in 2006 by Newsweek's Jay Mathews Challenge Index. Two students, Devan Earle and Chelsea Jones, appeared on the cover of the periodical. In 2007, TAG retained the #1 position, moved to #2 in 2008 and returned to #1 in 2009. It was once again #1 in 2010.
- TAG is consistently rated the Best Public High School in Dallas by D Magazine.
- Texas Monthly ranks TAG as one of the top 25 schools in Texas.
- TAG is a Blue Ribbon School.
- Rated "Exemplary" by the Texas Education Agency every year since the inception of the program.
- Texas Business & Education Coalition Honor Roll Award in 2004, 2006, and 2007.
- University Interscholastic League (UIL) Champions for District 9-AAAAA in both 2004 and 2005.
- TAG was ranked #14 among Gold Medal Schools and #3 among magnet schools in U.S. News & World Report's 2007 ranking of the best high schools in the United States.

=== Advanced Placement Awards ===
The following awards are from the Advanced Placement of the College Board.

- Recognition for having the highest passing rates in the world for Computer Science and Human Geography for 2004-05.
- Ranked first in the state of Texas for overall passing rates as a school since 2001.
- Two AP State Scholars were announced each year for each state, and TAG had both in 2002, one in 2004, one in 2005 and one in 2007. The State AP Scholar award was recently discontinued as of the May 2020 AP Exam Placement administration.
- Named a “worldwide leader” for the participation and performance for Art History, Computer Science, and Human Geography tests for 2003–2004.

=== Student Awards ===
- In 2006, TAG had two National Merit Scholarship winners, one received the Achievement Scholarship for outstanding black students and the other received the National Merit $2,500 Scholarship.
- In 2004, a TAG student won the statewide Tom Luce Advanced Placement Scholarship, a $5,000 award given once a year.
- In 2002, a TAG student was awarded a National Merit Scholarship, the O'Donnell Foundation Merit Scholarship.

=== Faculty Awards ===
- In 2007, Robert G. Martin, computer science instructor, received the Texas Instruments Foundation Innovations in Science, Technology, Engineering and Math Teaching Award.
- In 2008, Rebecca McGowan Jensen, Ph.D., physics and statistics instructor, received the Metroplex Technology Business Council's Tech Titan of the Future High School Level award.

== Traditions ==
Integral to the TAG environment, traditions play a major role in school spirit. There are many traditions at the Talented and Gifted magnet, some are student traditions, such as Arts Week, ICAP, and Scrapbook, and some are school traditions such as TAG-IT, TREK, and TAG Forum.

=== Scrapbook ===
Scrapbook is a yearly tradition in which the senior class collectively pulls together a scrapbook of events throughout the year, and before graduation, publishes a copy for all the seniors and sells copies to any underclassman that wants one. The scrapbook is officially a collective publication of the members of the Senior Class and expresses their opinions and memories of the school. It is not officially sanctioned by the school.

=== Inklings literary magazine ===
Inklings is a monthly publication featuring student submissions of editorials, reviews, poetry, and general fiction stories. It is also TAG's only regularly published, school-affiliated magazine, following the regular publication of the TAG*Magazine in the 1990s.

=== TAG-IT, TREK, & TAG Forum ===
TAG-IT, TREK, & TAG Forum are three all-school interdisciplinary seminars. TAG TREK is three-day, off-campus curricular field trip. TAG-IT is two-day curricular exercise of special course offerings both on and off campus. TAG Forum is a one day of presentations from experts in various fields of interest for students.

== Extracurricular activities ==
=== Academic Honor Societies ===
International Thespian Society, Mu Alpha Theta, National Honor Society, English National Honor Society, Spanish National Honor Society, and Science National Honor Society.

=== UIL Competitions ===
Students at the TAG Magnet participate in numerous University Interscholastic League (UIL) sponsored competitions including:

Accounting, Calculator Applications, Computer Applications, Computer Science, Cross Examination Debate, Current Events and Issues, Editorial Writing, Extemporaneous Informative Speech, Extemporaneous Persuasive Speech, Feature Writing, Headline Writing, Lincoln-Douglas Debate, Literary Criticism, Mathematics, News Writing, Number Sense, One-Act Play, Poetry Interpretation, Prose Interpretation, Ready Writing, Science, Social Studies, Solo and Ensemble (Band, Choir, and Orchestra), Spelling and Vocabulary.

=== Clubs and organizations ===
The TAG Magnet also has several student and school run clubs and organizations including:

Academic Decathlon, Destination Imagination, Math Olympiads, Mock Trial, Robotics, Science Fair, Quiz Bowl, Ballet Folklorico, Chess Club, Cross-Country Club, Dallas Association of Minority Engineers (DAME), Gay and Straight Alliance (GASP), German Dance, Junior State of America (JSA), Pan-American Student Forum (PASF), Student Council, Students Against Global Abuse (SAGA), Texas Area Model of American States (TAMOAS), Texas Association of Future Educators (TAFE), Youth for Global Improvement (YGI).
