= School of Health Professions =

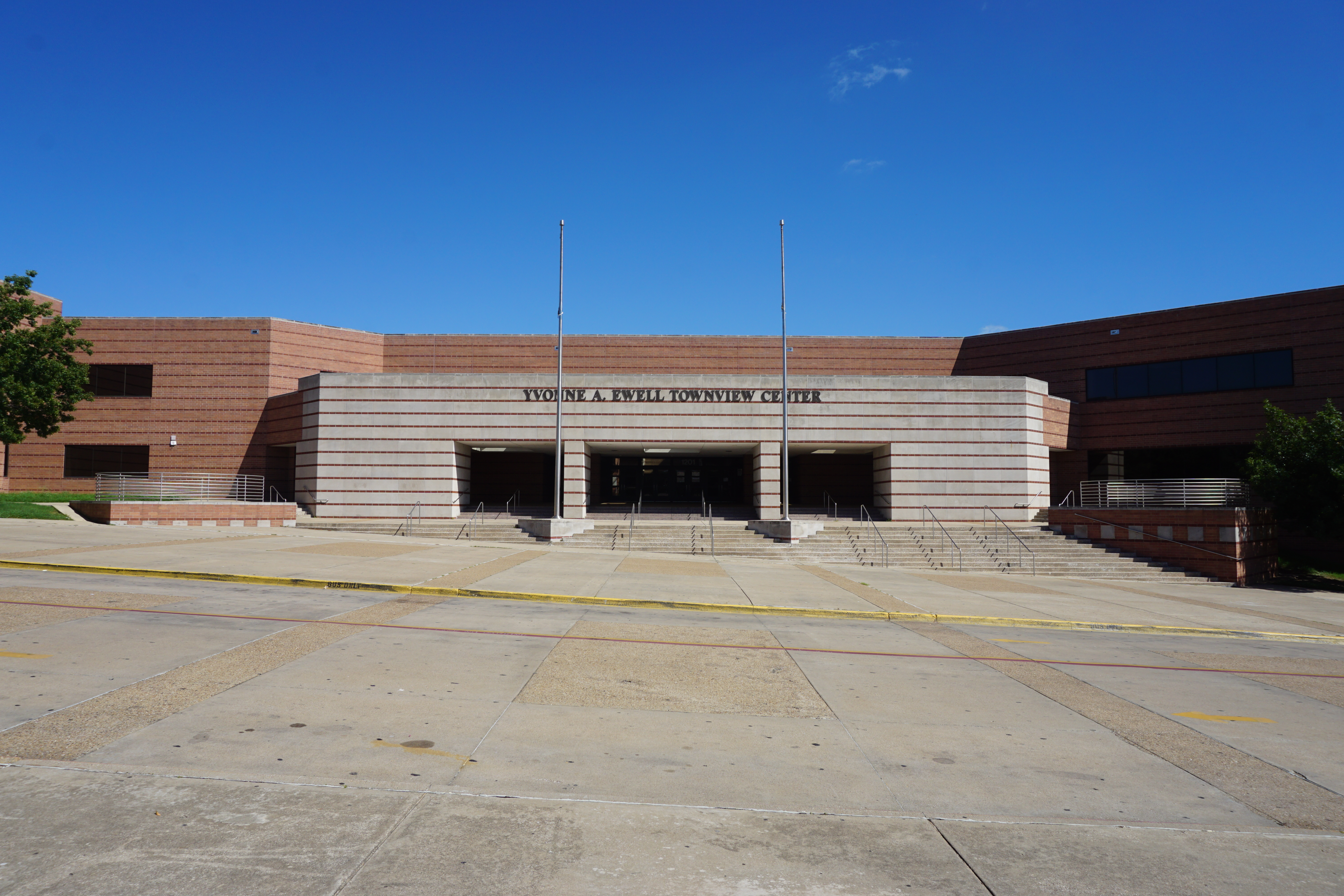
- Yvonne A. Ewell Townview Magnet Center, which houses this school.

Location
- 1201 East Eighth Street; Dallas, Texas 75203; United States
- Coordinates: 32.7522°N 96.8067°W

Information
- Type: Public magnet high school
- School district: Dallas Independent School District
- NCES School ID: 481623001273
- Principal: LaSandra Sanders
- Teaching staff: 32.30 (on an FTE basis)
- Grades: 9–12
- Gender: Co-educational
- Enrollment: 549 (2016-2017)
- Student to teacher ratio: 17.00
- Colors: Royal blue and silver
- Mascot: Lion
- Website: www.dallasisd.org/healthmagnet

The School of Health Professions is a public magnet high school in Dallas, Texas, United States. It is housed in the Yvonne A. Ewell Townview Magnet Center and is part of the Dallas Independent School District.

There are several clusters within the school, including Medical Laboratory Practicum, Clinical Medical Assisting/Billing & Coding, Exercise Science/Sports Medicine, dental laboratory technology, Patient Care Technician. Membership in the Health Occupations Students of America is encouraged where students can compete and gain leadership roles, as well as through the National Honor Society, among many others. In 2012, it was ranked as fourth out of the top ten high schools in the North Texas area by Children at Risk, a research and advocacy institute dedicated to helping children.
