= School of Science and Engineering =

Location
- 1201 East Eighth Street; Dallas, Texas 75203; United States; 32.7522°N 96.8068°W

Information
- Type: Public, Secondary
- Motto: SEM...where the possibilities are endless!
- Founded: 1982
- School district: Dallas Independent School District
- Principal: Joshua Newton
- Faculty: 26
- Grades: 9-12
- Enrollment: 490 (2022-23)
- Color: Maroon
- Mascot: Eagle
- USNWR ranking: No. 23 (2026)
- Trustee dist.: 5, Lew Blackburn
- Website: semagnet.dallasisd.org

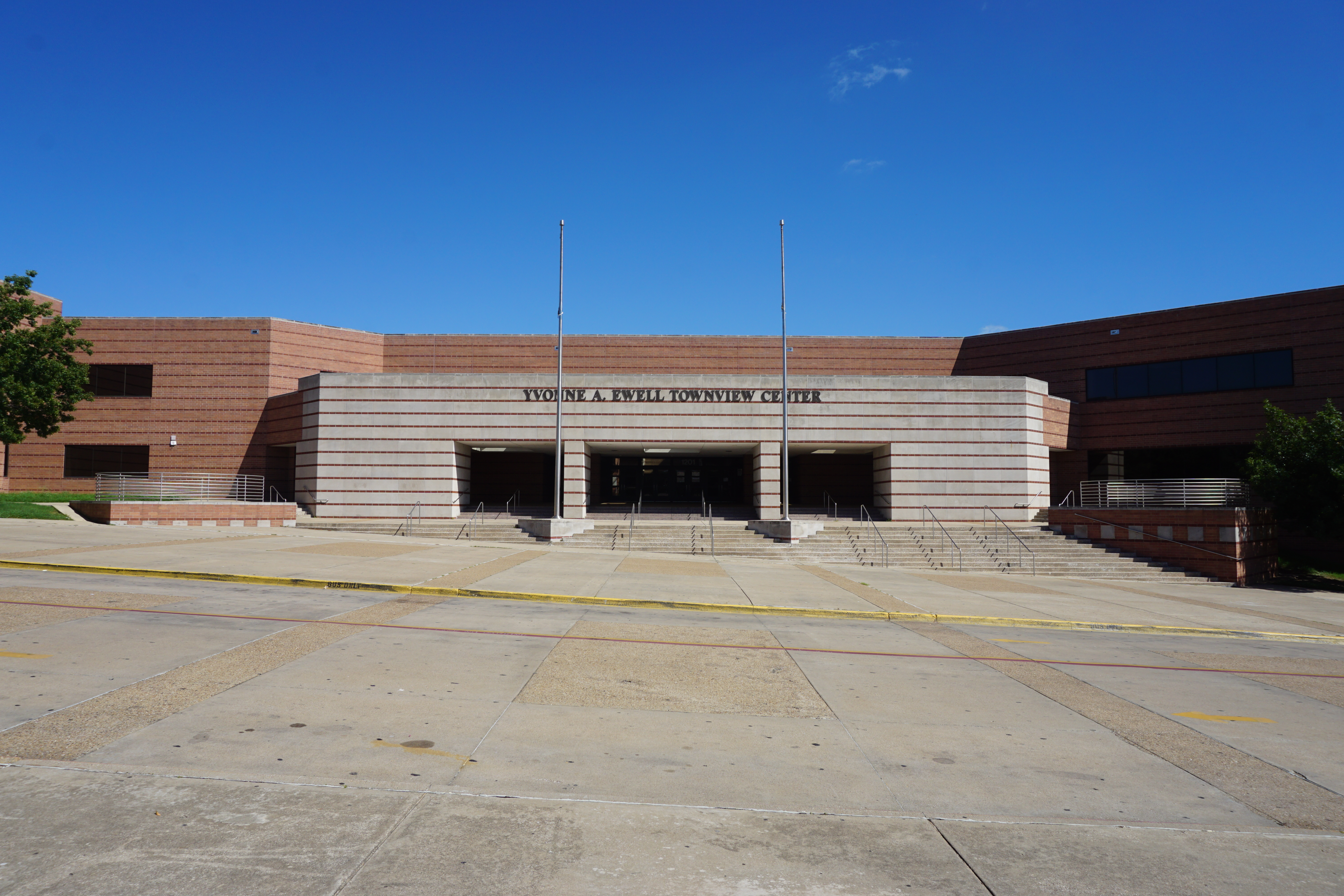
Yvonne A. Ewell Townview Magnet Center, which houses this school

The School of Science and Engineering Magnet (known as the School of Science and Engineering or SEM) is a magnet college preparatory high school located in the Yvonne A. Ewell Townview Magnet Center, home of six magnet high schools in the Dallas Independent School District. SEM's mascot is an eagle. Its school colors are maroon and white. Its current principal is Joshua Newton. Past principals include Dr. Andrew Palacios, Tiffany Huitt (who was promoted to DISD Executive Director), Dr. Jovan Carisa Wells, and Richard White. The Science Engineering Magnet originally had clusters located at the Nolan Estes Plaza prior to moving to Townview.

== Academics ==
On admission, each student is placed into one of three math and science "tracks" based on their performance in previous mathematics courses and a special placement test—a Regular Track, a Fast Track, and a Superfast Track. Each track is paced differently and completes a different number and difficulty of math and science courses.

SEM Math Track Schedules (excl. Geometry)
	1st	2nd	3rd	4th
Regular	Algebra II	Algebra II	Algebra II	Algebra II
Fast	Algebra II	Algebra II	Precalculus	Precalculus
Superfast (double-blocked)	Algebra II	Precalculus	AP Calculus AB	AP Calculus AB

SEM stresses a philosophy of hands-on science education, and specializes in offering science, technology, engineering, and mathematics courses. Its mathematics courses range in complexity from Geometry and Honors Algebra II (the lowest-level courses offered) to AP Calculus BC, AP Statistics, and its own unique Advanced Topics of the Theory of Applied Mathematics (A.T.T.A.M.) course. Science courses range from basic-level courses such as Pre-AP Biology to higher-level courses such as AP Physics C and AP Chemistry. Of special note is SEM's unique "SuperLab" class, a laboratory-based course which combines the material of both AP Physics C and AP Chemistry. Tech courses that instruct students in Computer Science concepts are available in the form of AP Computer Science Principles and AP Computer Science A, with a third "CS III: Data Structures and Algorithms" class taught to students who choose to take the class as an elective.

== Recognition ==
In both 2005 and 2011, SEM has received the Blue Ribbon School award by the U.S. Department of Education.

SEM was ranked as second best high school in the United States in 2007 according to the survey "The 1200 Best Public High Schools in the USA", it was eighth in 2006 and sixth in 2005. In 2007, SEM was ranked as the 18th best public high school in America by U.S. News & World Report.

The College Board announced that SEM is number 1 in the world for passing minorities in Calculus AB and number one in the United States for passing Hispanics in Computer Science. In 2006, SEM was visited by President George W. Bush for excellence in education and the school's philosophy of emphasizing math and science, something he stressed in his 2006 State of the Union address. The school consistently ranks number one in D Magazine's Best Public High Schools in Dallas and has been named the Academic UIL District Champion for District 9-5A and 11-5A in 2006 and 2007 respectively.

In 2011, SEM was ranked the number 1 high school in America by the Washington Post. The school was also ranked number 1 in the Newsweek list of America's Best High Schools. In 2012, it was ranked the number one high school in the North Texas area by Children at Risk, a research and advocacy institute dedicated to helping children:

- 2012 - SEM wins the Intel School of Distinction Award for the Best High School Math Program in the Country.
- 2012 - SEM Ranked #2 (out of 1900 public high schools) -Washington Post High School Challenge
- 2012 - SEM Ranked #4 (out of 1000 public high schools) -Newsweek.com [1]

In 2018, SEM was ranked as the 13th best public high school in America by U.S. News & World Report.

In 2019, SEM was ranked as the number 1 best public high school in Texas by the U.S. News & World Report. SEM also ranked 12th place as the best public high school in America.

In 2026, SEM was ranked as the number 3 best public high school in Texas by the U.S. News & World Report. SEM also ranked 23rd as the best public high school in America.

== Extracurricular activities ==
Due to rules and regulations involving magnet schools, SEM has no sports teams (although students may participate in those of their home schools). However, it does provide a wide variety of extracurricular activities and UIL teams:

- Orchestra
- UIL Calculator Team
- UIL Journalism Team
- Academic Decathlon
- "Big D" Marching Band
- UIL Number Sense Team
- Townview Theatre Company
- Choir
- Intergirls
- French Club
- Environmental Science/Volunteering Club
- Chess Club
- Latin Club
- Robotics
- UIL Literary Criticism
- National Honor Society
- National Latin Honor Society
- UIL Math Team
- SEM Yearbook
- UIL One Act Play
- UIL Current Issues & Events Team
- UIL Science Team
- Finance/Economics Club
- Debate
- UIL Social Studies
- UIL Computer Science Team

SEM won the AAAAA individual UIL Computer Science event at the UIL State competition in Austin, Texas in 2001, and also won the AAAAA team UIL Computer Science competition in both 2000 and 2001. SEM also won the 2012 and 2013 Academic UIL Region 2 5A competition. At the 2015 UIL State competition in Austin, SEM put up the highest team score in UIL Calculator Applications in all of Texas. In recent years, SEM has consistently placed 1st in AAAA (4A) in UIL and TMSCA Number Sense and General Math, as well as often placing either 1st or 2nd in UIL/TMSCA Calculator Applications and UIL Computer Science.
