= Rylie, Dallas =

Area of Dallas, Texas, United States

Rylie is a neighborhood in Dallas, Texas that was formerly an unincorporated community in Dallas County. Rylie is located between Interstate 20 and U.S. Highway 175 along a former Southern Pacific Railroad line, 11 miles (18 km) southeast of Downtown Dallas. Rylie is a part of the Southeast Dallas area.

== History ==
Rylie was the original land grant of J. R. Rylie, who settled in the area as early as 1855. The community had been established by the 1870s. In 1881 the Texas trunk line had been established through Rylie. A post office opened in 1883. By 1885 Rylie had become a point of shipping for cordwood and cotton. By the same year the community had 25 residents, two churches, one school, and a general store. In 1900 the community had 50 residents. By 1914 Rylie's population had increased to 64. By the same year Rylie had a general store and telephone service. The population had decreased to 30 by 1925. The post office closed by 1930. During that year, the community moved from a site on the railroad to a new site along U.S. Highway 175, .25 miles (0.40 km) to the northeast of the original location. By the late 1940s the population increased to 180 and the community had eight businesses. The population growth continued into the 1960s. In 1965 the community had 950 people; this was the last time Rylie's population was reported in the Texas Almanac.

== Education ==
=== Primary and secondary schools ===
Rylie is in the Dallas Independent School District.

Zoned schools include:

- H. Grady Spruce High School
- E. B. Comstock Middle School
- Nancy Moseley Elementary School
- Ebby Halliday Elementary School in Rylie, opened in 2011.

Rylie had received a school by 1885.

=== Public libraries ===
Dallas Public Library operates the Kleberg-Rylie Branch Library, which opened in 1995.

== Parks and recreation ==
The Kleberg-Rylie Community Center, operated by Dallas Parks, serves the community.
