= Don McLeroy =

Texan Republican

John Donald "Don" McLeroy
- Born: June 3, 1946 (age 80)
- Occupation: Dentist
- Known for: Former member of the Texas State Board of Education; Advocate of Young Earth Creationism
- Political party: Republican

John Donald "Don" McLeroy (born June 3, 1946) is a Republican former member of the Texas State Board of Education (SBOE). The SBOE establishes policy for the state public school system. McLeroy, who represented SBOE District 9 (Bryan and College Station), served on the board from 1998 until 2011. He was appointed in 2007 as SBOE chairman by Governor Rick Perry. The term ended in February 2009.

== Education and personal life ==
Before being appointed chairman, McLeroy was vice chairman of the Texas State Board of Education. He has been a board member of the Bryan Independent School District and is a board member of Aggieland Pregnancy Outreach, which is a Christian adoption organization for "families who have a love for Jesus Christ." McLeroy volunteers with the Boy Scouts of America and Gideons International. He is an Elder and Sunday school teacher at Grace Bible Church in College Station, where he espouses creationism in the biblical perspective. He believes Christians who accept evolution show a "lack of consistency."

== Public service ==
McLeroy's term on the board expired in January 2011.

McLeroy was appointed Chair of the SBOE on July 17, 2007, by Governor Perry for a term that expired on February 1, 2009. In February 2009, he was reappointed by Perry to a term ending February 1, 2011. However, during a two-hour hearing before the Senate Nomination Committee, McLeroy's reappointment ran into trouble. On May 28, 2009, his appointment failed to receive the necessary 2/3 majority vote of the Senate with only 19 of 31 Senators voting to approve, 11 voting to reject, and one abstaining.

== Texas State Board of Education ==
McLeroy has been criticized by scientists and lauded by conservatives for his actions on the Texas Board of Education.

Governor Perry reappointed McLeroy, an advocate of creationism, as chairman to a second extend until February 1, 2011, but on May 28, 2009, the Texas Senate rejected the re-appointment; although the vote was 19-11 in favor with one member abstaining (along party lines; all 19 Senate members voting to reappoint were Republicans, while all 11 Senate members voting to reject and the one abstaining member were Democrats) the reappointment required a 2/3 majority for approval. McLeroy lost re-election to a moderate in the Republican primary in March 2010.

McLeroy's tenure on the SBOE is chronicled in the 2012 documentary The Revisionaries.

The SBOE thus selects the textbooks for the entire state's 4.7 million schoolchildren, where in most other states this selection is made in individual school districts. As a result, it "has outsized influence over the reading material used in classrooms nationwide, since publishers craft their standard textbooks based on the specs of the biggest buyers."

Kathy Miller, president of the Texas Freedom Network, said that McLeroy dragged the Texas State Board of Education into a series of "divisive and unnecessary culture-war battles". In 2001, McLeroy voted to reject the only advanced placement textbook for environmental science proposed for Texas high schools even though panels of experts – including one from Texas A&M – found the textbook free of errors. Baylor University in Waco used the same textbook.

In 2003, McLeroy led efforts to promote creationism and intelligent design to de-emphasize discussion of evolution in proposed new biology textbooks. He was one of only four board members who voted against biology textbooks that year that included a full account of evolution.

Over objections by his critics in 2004, McLeroy voted to approve health textbooks that stress "abstinence-only" in regard to instruction about pregnancy and prevention of sexually transmitted diseases.

In 2005, McLeroy conducted a sermon in his church, in which he said naturalism is "the enemy" and questioned: "Why is Intelligent Design the big tent? Because we’re all lined up against the fact that naturalism, that nature is all there is. Whether you're a progressive creationist, recent creationist, young earth, old earth, it's all in the tent of Intelligent Design."

According to a 2008 article in The New York Times, "Dr. McLeroy believes that Earth's appearance is a recent geologic event — thousands of years old, not 4.5 billion. 'I believe a lot of incredible things,' he said, 'The most incredible thing I believe is the Christmas story. That little baby born in the manger was the God that created the universe.'" McLeroy's statements regarding science have been criticized. McLeroy and other Board members who want to challenge evolution have received criticism from more than fifty secular scientific organizations over an attempt to weaken the commonly believed theory of evolution. In particular, biologist Kenneth R. Miller called McLeroy's statements on science "breathtakingly" incorrect.

In March 2008, McLeroy was criticized for racially and culturally insensitive remarks saying: "What good does it do to put a Chinese story in an English book? ... So you really don't want Chinese books with a bunch of crazy Chinese words in them." He later apologized.

In 2009, McLeroy spoke at a board meeting using several quotes from scientists to discredit evolution. A biology teacher later found the quotes incomplete, out of context, and/or incorrectly taken from a creationist website. McLeroy said that while "some of the material was taken from the creationist site […] a lot of the quotes I did get on my own." McLeroy appeared on the Comedy Central program the Colbert Report in April 2012 wherein he said "In the beginning, God created the heavens and the earth, and when I looked at the evidence for evolution, I found it unconvincing so I don't think he used evolution to do it, that's my big deal."

On May 28, 2009, McLeroy's nomination as board chair failed to gain state Senate approval. Only nineteen of the thirty-one state senators voted for him, two votes short of the 2/3 majority needed for approval. Gail Lowe became the new chair (since then Barbara Cargill), but McLeroy continued to dominate board meetings in what Russell Shorto described as "a single-handed display of arch-conservative political strong-arming."

In an interview in October 2009, McLeroy explained his approach to public school history textbook evaluation: "... we are a Christian nation founded on Christian principles. The way I evaluate history textbooks is first I see how they cover Christianity and Israel. Then I see how they treat Ronald Reagan — he needs to get credit for saving the world from communism and for the good economy over the last twenty years because he lowered taxes." McLeroy also did an interview about the hearings and the documentary on The Skeptics' Guide to the Universe.
