= Michael Hinojosa =

Americam superintendent (born 1956)

Eliu Misael "Michael" Hinojosa (born 1956) was the superintendent of the Dallas Independent School District (DISD) and former superintendent of the Cobb County School District.

He originated from the Oak Cliff area of Dallas.

== Career ==
Hinojosa's first job at DISD was at W.H. Adamson High School, where he taught classes and coached sports teams.

He was superintendent of Spring ISD in Spring, Texas from 2002 until 2005. He began his continuous period as DISD superintendent on May 12, 2005.

Under his first term, DISD absorbed the Wilmer-Hutchins Independent School District (WHISD) and a school bond for $1.35 million was successfully implemented. In 2008, several layoffs occurred as a budget deficit for $64 million appeared suddenly, and The Dallas Morning News stated that this damaged his period of leadership. During his tenure he attempted to become superintendent of the Clark County School District in Las Vegas.

In 2011, he announced that he was moving to the Cobb County School District in the Atlanta area. The DMN stated that the move to Cobb "caught many people off guard, including the school board", and that it resulted in "a sense of betrayal". He had already signed a contract renewal as DISD superintendent for three years when he announced he was moving. As a result of his first period, he was the longest-serving DISD superintendent of the post-1980s period. His final day in his first period was June 30, 2011.

He returned to DISD, becoming interim superintendent in July 2015, succeeding Mike Miles. Hinojosa was hired again as superintendent in October of that year. His term was extended to December 31, 2020 in a unanimous vote in 2018. In September 2019 the DISD board voted 6-1 to renew his term until September 2024. In January 2022, Hinojosa announced he would resign before the end of 2022, potentially to run for mayor of Dallas.

Educational offices
Preceded by Mike Miles	Dallas Independent School District superintendent 2015–present	Incumbent
Preceded by Larry Groppel (interim)	Dallas Independent School District superintendent 2016-2018	Succeeded by Alan King (interim)
