= School of Education and Social Services =

Rosie M. Collins Sorrells School of Education and Social Services

Location
- 1201 East Eighth Street; Dallas, Texas 75203; United States; 32.752375°N 96.806883°W

Information
- Type: public, secondary, magnet
- Motto: "Building Responsible Individuals Who Will Devote Themselves to Creating Good Everywhere"
- School district: Dallas Independent School District
- Principal: Valarie Kendrick
- Faculty: 9
- Grades: 9-12
- Enrollment: 328
- Colors: Navy Blue and Columbia Blue
- Mascot: The Fabulous Phoenix
- Trustee dist.: 5, Lew Blackburn
- Website: Official website

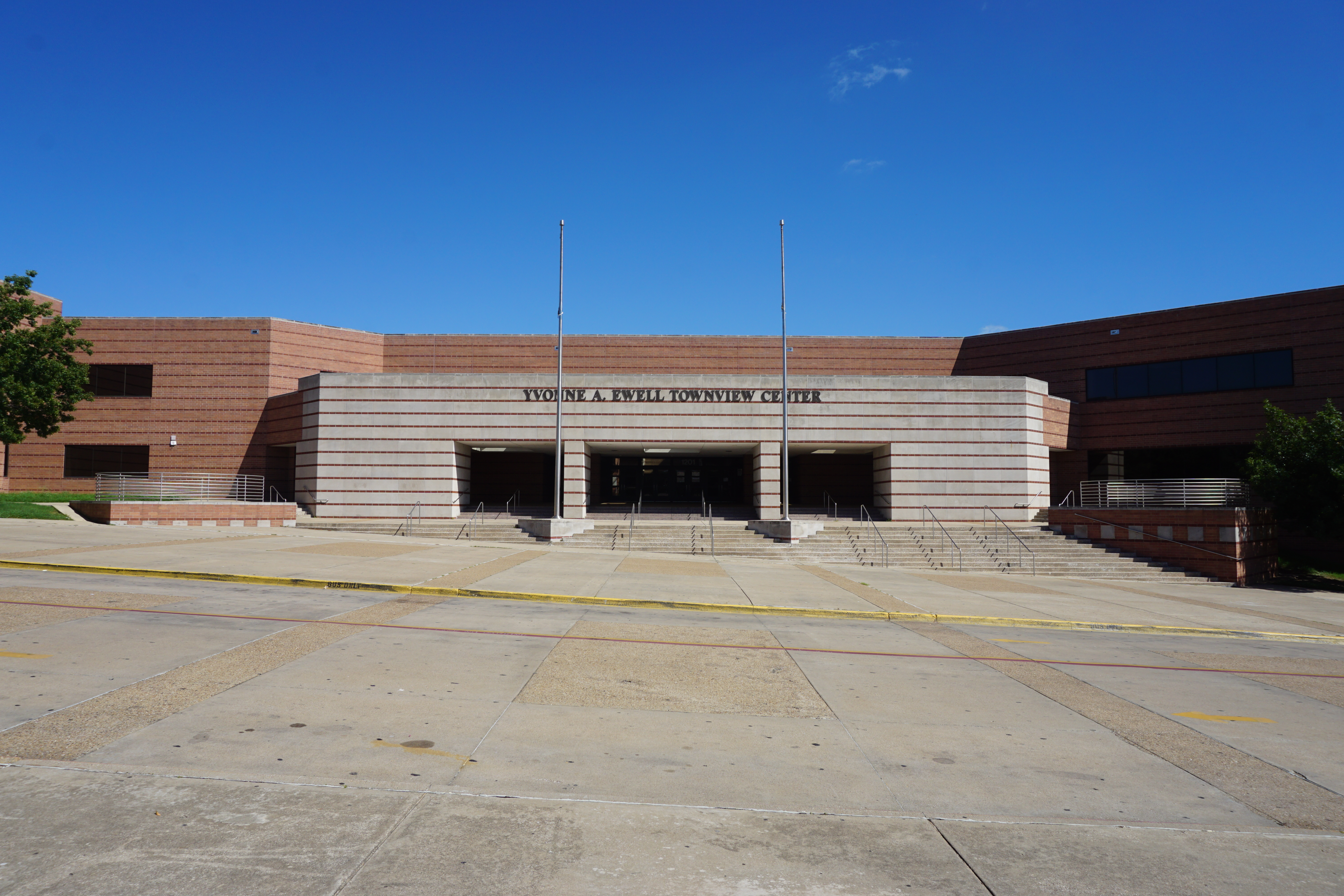
Yvonne A. Ewell Townview Magnet Center, which houses this school

Rosie M. Collins Sorrells School of Education and Social Services is a magnet secondary school located in Dallas, Texas, United States. It is a part of the Dallas Independent School District and is within the Yvonne A. Ewell Townview Magnet Center. In 2012, it was ranked 7th out of the top 10 high schools in North Texas by Children at Risk, a research and advocacy institute dedicated to helping children.

== History ==
Formerly the Education and Social Services Magnet (ESSM), this Dallas ISD high school is now Rosie M. Collins Sorrells School of Education and Social Services . ESSM is one of six Magnet High Schools housed in the Yvonne A. Ewell Townview Magnet Center since 1995.

== Location ==
The majority of ESSM classrooms are located on the bottom floor of the Townview Magnet Center. this includes the Office of the Dean, the Office of the Counselor, and the main classrooms that house the career and technical education teachers.

== The Program ==
Students of SESS have the choice of being in one of two "clusters". These clusters are Social Services (SS), and Education (EDU). Students who desire to pursue a career in fields such as Teaching, owning a day care, psychology, any field working with children, social work, and school administrative positions are encouraged to apply for the SESS. The school mascot is “The Fabulous Phoenix”, and the colors are Navy and Columbia Blue. The School of Education and Social Services accepts about 50 students per class, and graduates close to one-hundred percent of their seniors.

Cluster teacher create material specified to the career field that they teach. For example, the Education Cluster Coordinator creates materials behooving of future educators such as the following: how to successfully manage a classroom, the mechanics of creating lesson plans, and even special internships in which students become teacher aides their junior year, and administrative interns their senior year. This is an experience not boasted or offered by many other high schools. The Social Services Cluster teaches the students a range of concepts ranging from how to work in a hospital to how to work with a non-profit and everything in between. In the first two years they receive the basics of what it means to be in Social Services and then in junior and senior year they are placed in the work field at different internships. It is the goal that they choose an internship their junior year and continue at that internship their senior year, many times these placement sites will offer the students a part-time summer job as well. This allows for the children to already start to network in their chosen field.

Furthermore, the program is designed in such a way that students spend three of the four years in high school in the same cluster, enabling students to become a family with bonds of friendship. There are also opportunities to join profession related organizations such as the Texas Association of Future Educators (TAFE), Family, Career and Community Leaders of America (FCCLA), Peer Assistant Leadership Services (PALS), and Mu Alpha Theta (ΜΑΘ) just to name a few.
