= The Revisionaries =

- Theatrical release poster
- Directed by: Scott Thurman
- Written by: Jawad Metni; Scott Thurman
- Produced by: Pierson Silver; Orlando Wood; Scott Thurman
- Edited by: Jawad Metni
- Music by: Mark Orton
- Production companies: Silver Lining Films; Magic Hour Entertainment; Naked Edge Films
- Distributed by: Kino Lorber
- Release date: April 21, 2012
- Running time: 92 minutes
- Country: United States
- Language: English
- Box office: $21,731

The Revisionaries is a 2012 documentary film about the re-election of Don McLeroy, the former chairman of the Texas Board of Education. The film also details how the Texas Board's decisions on textbook content influence textbooks across the nation and affect the American culture war. The Revisionaries was directed by Scott Thurman and produced by Silver Lining Films, Magic Hour Productions, and Naked Edge Films.

The film generated a great deal of buzz prior to its premiere on April 20, 2012 at the Tribeca Film Festival. Texas Monthly reported that "[t]he film received rave reviews after its Tribeca premiere." The Revisionaries went on to win the Festival's Special Jury Prize. During the awards presentation, Michael Moore stated "I hope every American sees this film", and called The Revisionaries "a must-see film for anyone concerned about enforced ignorance and intolerance, and for those who still believe in science and in Thomas Jefferson."

On July 18, 2012, Kino Lorber acquired all North American rights to The Revisionaries. The film premiered theatrically on October 5, 2012 in Dallas, Texas, and the Public Broadcasting Service's (PBS) Independent Lens aired an abridged version of the film in late January 2013. The Revisionaries went on to win the 2013 PBS Independent Lens Audience Award and the 2014 duPont Award for excellence in broadcast journalism.
