= Mike Moses (educator) =

American educator

Mike Moses is a former commissioner of the Texas Education Agency (TEA) and a former superintendent for the Dallas Independent School District (DISD).

He first served in the TEA before serving in DISD. The DISD board hired him in 2000, and he began his term as DISD superintendent on January 1, 2001.

He wrapped up the district's participation in a Federal Bureau of Investigation (FBI) that had been started previously and guided the district through a voter-approved 2002 $1.37 billion school bond. He eventually resigned, citing exhaustion. His final day was August 31, 2004. By 2013 he was the head of School Executive Consulting, Inc., a consulting firm matching school districts with possible superintendents.
