= Texas Education Agency =

Education branch of the government of Texas, United States

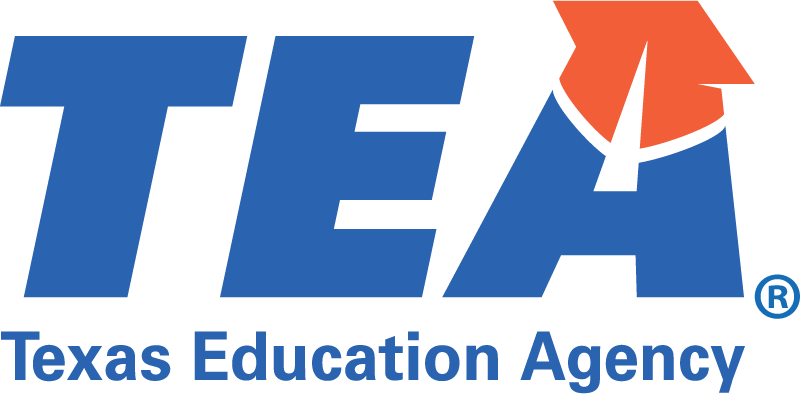
- The Texas Education Agency logo

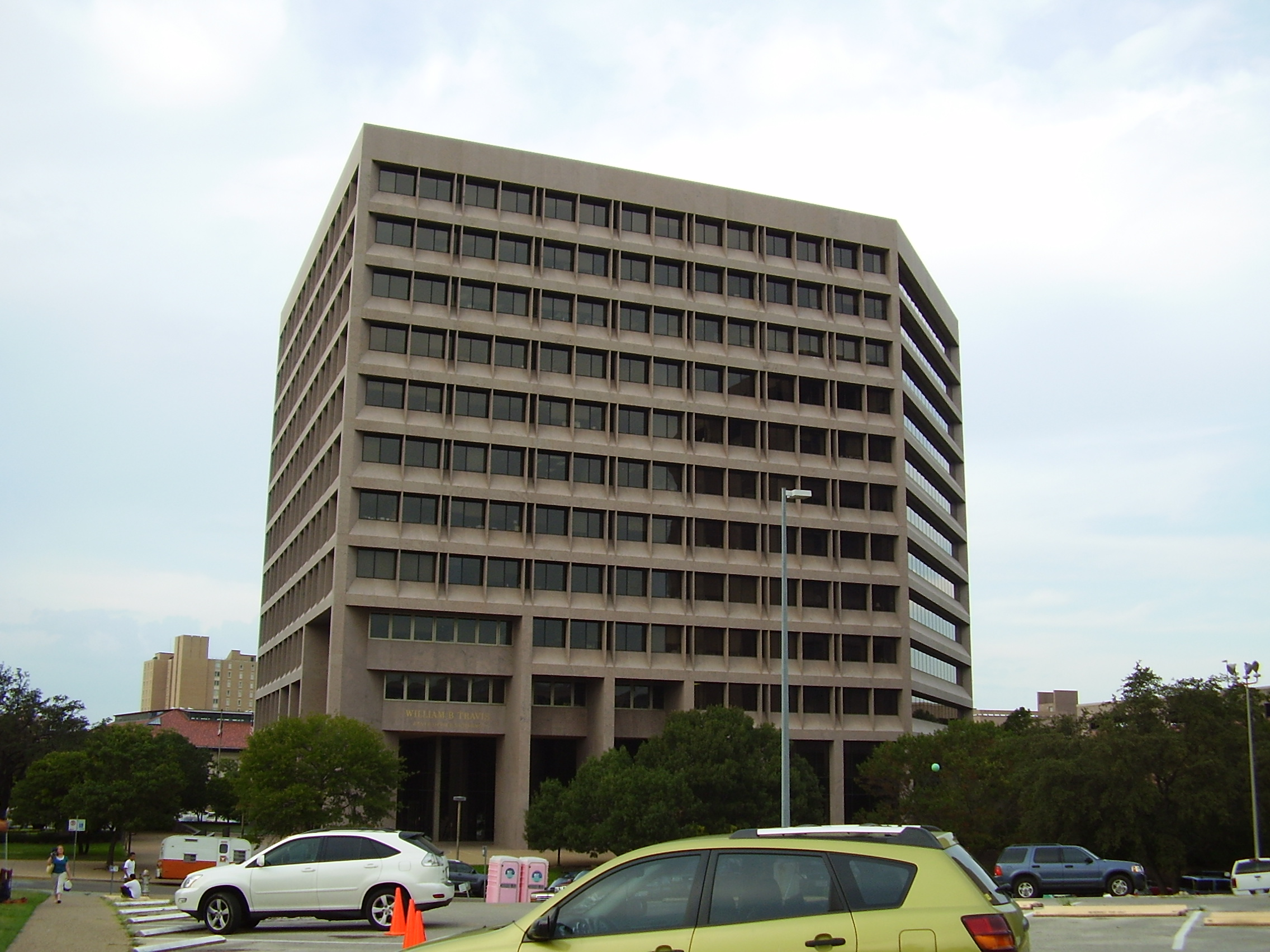
- The main offices of the Texas Education Agency are located in the William B. Travis State Office Building in Downtown Austin.

Agency overview
- Formed: 1949
- Jurisdiction: Texas
- Headquarters: 1701 North Congress Avenue, Austin, Texas, U.S.
- Agency executives: Mike Morath, Commissioner; Von Byer, General Counsel; Megha Kansra, Deputy Commissioner of District Planning and Implementation; Steve Lecholop, Deputy Commissioner of Governance; Kristin McGuire, Deputy Commissioner of Special Populations and Student Supports; Kelvey Oeser, Deputy Commissioner of Educator Support; Melody Parrish, Deputy Commissioner of Technology; John Scott, Chief of School Safety and Security; Carla Steffen, Deputy Commissioner of Finance
- Website: tea.texas.gov

The Texas Education Agency (TEA) is the branch of the government of Texas responsible for public education in Texas in the United States. The agency is headquartered in the William B. Travis State Office Building in downtown Austin. Mike Morath, formerly a member of the Dallas Independent School District's board of trustees, was appointed commissioner of education by Texas governor Greg Abbott on December 14, 2015, and began serving on January 4, 2016. The commissioner is also supported by a hierarchy of Chief Deputy Commissioner, Deputy Commissioner, associate commissioners and agency staff.

== History ==
In 1854, the first state school census showed an enrollment of 65,463 students. However, the educational landscape in Texas looked quite different in the following decades. Prior to the late 1940s, many school districts in Texas did not operate schools, but instead spent money to send children to schools operated by other districts. In the late 1940s, state lawmakers passed a bill abolishing those districts, prompting a wave of mass school district consolidation. 4,500 school districts were consolidated in 2,900 almost immediately after the statute was put in place. The 1949 legislature abolished the previous State Board of Education and the Gilmer-Aikin Laws established the Texas Education Agency. The Gilmer-Aikin Laws refer to when the Fifteenth Legislature, in 1947, created a committee to study education reform in the State of Texas due to legislative deadlock over teacher salary; they presented a final report and recommendations to the House on January 26, 1949. The committee was named after Representative Claud Gilmer and Senator A.M. Aikin, Jr.

== Duties ==
TEA is responsible for the oversight of public primary and secondary education in the state of Texas, involving over 1,000 independent school districts in the state. There are 916 charter school campuses. It is also responsible for the safety of students. However, it does not have any jurisdiction over private or parochial schools (whether or not accredited) nor over home schools.

The agency continuously evolves to comply with federal regulations, state legislation, and the evolving needs of Texas students and educators. The responsibilities of the TEA have expanded to encompass:

- Setting curriculum standards (like TEKS)
- Administering statewide tests (such as STAAR)
- Accrediting schools
- Distributing funds
- Overseeing special education
- Supporting teacher certification and accountability

Although school districts are independent governmental entities, TEA has the authority to oversee a district's operations (either involving an individual school or the entire district) if serious issues arise (such as poor standardized test performance, financial distress, or mismanagement). This oversight of school districts by TEA is measured by school performance. TEA collects a majority of this type of information through Public Education Information Management system, or PEIMS. PEIMS collects data about student demographic, academic performance, and financial, personnel, and organizational information. The other forms of data collection are the Texas Academic Performance Reports, TAPR, A-F Accountability Ratings, and School Report Cards, that give the A-F rating. This can be in the form of requiring the district to submit corrective action plans and regular status reports, assigning monitors to oversee operations (including the authority to assign a management board, which essentially replaces and performs the duties of the elected school board), and in extreme cases closure of a school campus or even the entire school district.

The University Interscholastic League (UIL), which oversees academic and athletic interscholastic competition in Texas public schools, is a separate entity not under TEA oversight.

In addition to primary and secondary education, TEA has oversight duties with respect to driver's education courses (initial permits) and defensive driving courses (used to have a ticket dismissed and/or for lower insurance premiums).

=== Texas Education Agency's Role with the Texas Education Freedom Accounts ===
The Texas Education Freedom Accounts is a program that was created to give parents more options beyond public school. Starting the 2026-2027 school year, children who have applied and been accepted into the program will receive funds that can be used for private school tuition, homeschool expenses that apply under educational purposes, career- focused programs and even tutoring. There will also be certain criteria private schools must maintain in order for their school to be eligible for this program. The Texas Education Agency will establish the amount a family will qualify for. If the private school is not recognized by the Texas Private School Accreditation or an additional accrediting agency authorized by Texas Education Agency for at least 2 years, they will not be considered. Texas Comptroller of Public Accounts will be in charge of making sure all funds are being used accordingly.

== Curriculum controversies ==
On November 7, 2007, Christine Comer resigned as the director of the science curriculum after more than nine years. Comer said that her resignation was a result of pressure from officials who claimed that she had given the appearance of criticizing the teaching of intelligent design.

In 2009, the board received criticism from more than 50 scientific organizations over an attempt to weaken science standards on evolution.

In October 2012, The Revisionaries, a documentary film about the re-election of the chairman of the Texas Board of Education Don McLeroy and the curriculum controversy, was released. In late January 2013, PBS's Independent Lens aired an abridged version the film.

Texas House Speaker Joe Straus of San Antonio, Texas said that the government should "take a look" at the structure of the board and consider a nonpartisan or appointed board if the elected members are "not getting their job done and they're not pleasing the Legislature or the citizens, then we ought to take) a thorough look at what they are doing." In 2010, Al Jezeera stated that it was "drafting its own version of American history", including altering school textbooks to remove what it said was a "left-leaning bias" and making changes that are said to have "religious and racial overtones".

In June 2024, Republican Lawmakers and others propose the idea of all elementary schools to adopt a curriculum of extensive biblical references in their classes. And there would be an additional $60 per student in additional funding. Then, in November 2024, the Texas Education Board voted and passed to allow new curriculum of Christian Values and add many biblical references and insert moral values into everyday teaching. Although it is not specifically required for school districts to implement teaching, they will gain additional funding from both federal and state level.

== Special education controversies ==
A series of reports in 2016 by the Houston Chronicle found that since at least 2004, TEA denied special education services to thousands of students, prompting a federal investigation. State education officials set an arbitrary limit of 8.5% for the number of students who could receive special education services. By strictly enforcing district compliance with the benchmark, the rate of students receiving special education in Texas fell to 8.5% in 2015, far below the national average of 13%. School districts implemented a wide range of practices to reduce the number of students, including cutting services for certain children with autism and dyslexia, refusing to conduct eligibility evaluations in other languages, and refusing to accept medical records from other countries. Students who are English Language Learners (ELL) also faced a disproportionate impact resulting in a 20% difference in the rate of ELL students getting special education services compared to native speakers. In Houston ISD, the state's largest school district, after the 8.5% goal was met the standard was lowered to 8%. As a result, the district cut hundreds of special education positions, postponed diagnostic evaluations to second grade, and created a list of disqualifying factors that keep students from getting services.

TEA issued a no-bid contract for $4.4 million to SPEDx in 2017 to analyze student records to assist with the overhaul of its special education practices. Advocates raised concerns about the lack of a competitive bidding process and the Georgia-based company's qualifications, and a former TEA special education director filed a federal complaint about TEA violating state procurement processes.

In 2018, the U.S. Department of Education found that "Texas violated federal law by failing to ensure students with disabilities were properly evaluated and provided with an adequate public education." A multi-year strategic plan was released in 2018. In a grant application to the agency, TEA stated that they will not be able to ensure adequate services for special education students until June 2020.

In September 2020, in the midst of several attempts to place Houston ISD under state control, TEA investigators recommended a state-appointed conservator be selected to oversee the district.

== Commissioner of education ==
The current commissioner of education is Mike Morath who was appointed by Texas Governor Greg Abbott.

The commissioner's role is to lead and manage the Texas Education Agency. The commissioner also co-ordinates efforts between state and federal agencies.

Commissioners of Education
#	Commissioner	Took office	Left office	Governor
1	J. W. Egdar	March 1950	June 30, 1974	Allan Shivers (1950–1957); Price Daniel (1957–1963); John Connally (1963–1969); Preston Smith (1963–1973); Dolph Briscoe (1973/1974)
2	M. L. Brockette	July 1, 1974	August 31, 1979	Dolph Briscoe (1974–1979); Bill Clements (1979)
3	Alton O. Bowen	September 1, 1979	May 31, 1981	Bill Clements (1979–1981)
4	Raymon L. Bynum	June 1, 1981	October 31, 1984	Bill Clements (1981–1983); Mark White (1984)
5	William N Kirby	Interim November 1, 1984 – April 12, 1985		Mark White (1984–1987); Bill Clements (1987–1991); Ann Richards (Jan 1991)
5	William N Kirby	November 1, 1984	January 31, 1991	Mark White (1984–1987); Bill Clements (1987–1991); Ann Richards (Jan 1991)
-	Tom Anderson (Interim)	February 1, 1991	June 30, 1991	Ann Richards
6	Lionel Meno	July 1, 1991	March 1, 1995	Ann Richards (1991–1995); George W. Bush (Feb-Mar 1995)
7	Michael Moses	March 9, 1995	September 3, 1999	George W. Bush
8	James Nelson	September 9, 1999	March 31, 2002	George W. Bush (1999–2000); Rick Perry (2000–2002)
9	Felipe T. Alanis	April 1, 2002	July 31, 2003	Rick Perry
-	Robert Scott (Interim) (1/2)	August 1, 2003	January 12, 2004	Rick Perry
10	Shirley J. Neeley	January 13, 2004	July 1, 2007	Rick Perry
11	Robert Scott (2/2)	Interim July 2, 2007 – October 15, 2007		Rick Perry
11	Robert Scott (2/2)	July 2, 2007	July 2, 2012	Rick Perry
-	Todd Webster (Acting)	July 3, 2012	August 31, 2012	Rick Perry
12	Michael Williams	September 1, 2012	December 31, 2015	Rick Perry (2012–2015); Greg Abbott (2015)
13	Mike Morath	January 1, 2016	Incumbent	Greg Abbott

== State Board of Education ==
Districts shaded by incumbent's party: Democratic (4) Republican (11)

TEA is overseen by a 15-member State Board of Education (SBOE) elected from single-member districts.

There are no term limits. Terms are four years in length, with one two-year term each decade. Similar to the arrangement of the Texas Senate, SBOE members are divided into two groups based in part on the intervening Census:

- In elections in years ending in 2 (the election after the Census), all 15 seats are up for election.
- Once the SBOE meets in session after said election, the members will participate in a drawing to determine their election cycle:
  - One-half will have a 2-4-4 cycle, whereupon the seat would stand for election in two years (the year ending in 4), followed by two four-year cycles (the years ending in 8 and 2).
  - The other half will have a 4-4-2 cycle, whereupon the seat would stand for election in four years (the year ending in 6), followed by another four-year cycle (the year ending in 0) but then the seat would stand for election in only two years (the year ending in 2).

As such, every two years, about half of the SBOE is on the ballot.

The board devises policies and sets academic standards for Texas public schools, and oversees the state Permanent School Fund and selects textbooks to be used in Texas schools.

Since 2011, the board can still recommend textbooks, but public school districts can order their own books and materials even if their selections are not on the state-approved list. So far, most districts have continued to follow the state-endorsed textbooks, but that trend is expected to change in the next two years as the districts become more cognizant of their available options. Thomas Ratliff, a moderate Republican and the son of former Lieutenant Governor Bill Ratliff of Mount Pleasant, in 2010 unseated the Bryan dentist Don McLeroy, a former education board chairman who was the leader of the conservative bloc. Ratliff said in 2013 that the board is "far different" in political complexion that it was in 2010. In 2022, the GOP captured an additional seat, bringing their total to 10 of the 15-member board. Many are social conservatives, campaigning against critical race theory and gender identity lessons.

District	Name	Party	Residence	Start	Next Election
1	Gustavo Reveles	Dem	El Paso	January 1, 2025	2028
2	LJ Francis	Rep	Corpus Christi	January 1, 2023	2026 (primaried)
3	Marisa Perez-Diaz	Dem	San Antonio	January 1, 2013	2028
4	Tammie Nielson	Rep	Pasadena	August 24, 2026	2026 (special)
5	Rebecca Bell-Metereau	Dem	San Marcos	January 1, 2021	2026 (retiring)
6	Will Hickman	Rep	Houston	January 1, 2021	2026 (retiring)
7	Julie Pickren	Rep	Pearland	January 1, 2023	2026
8	Audrey Young	Rep	Trinity	January 1, 2021	2026
9	Keven Ellis	Rep	Lufkin	January 1, 2017	2026 (retiring)
10	Tom Maynard	Rep	Florence	January 1, 2013	2028
11	Brandon Hall	Rep	Aledo	January 1, 2025	2028
12	Pam Little	Rep	Fairview	January 1, 2019	2028
13	Tiffany Clark	Dem	DeSoto	January 1, 2025	2026
14	Evelyn Brooks	Rep	Frisco	January 1, 2023	2026 (retiring)
15	Aaron Kinsey	Rep	Midland	January 1, 2023	2028

=== Regions ===
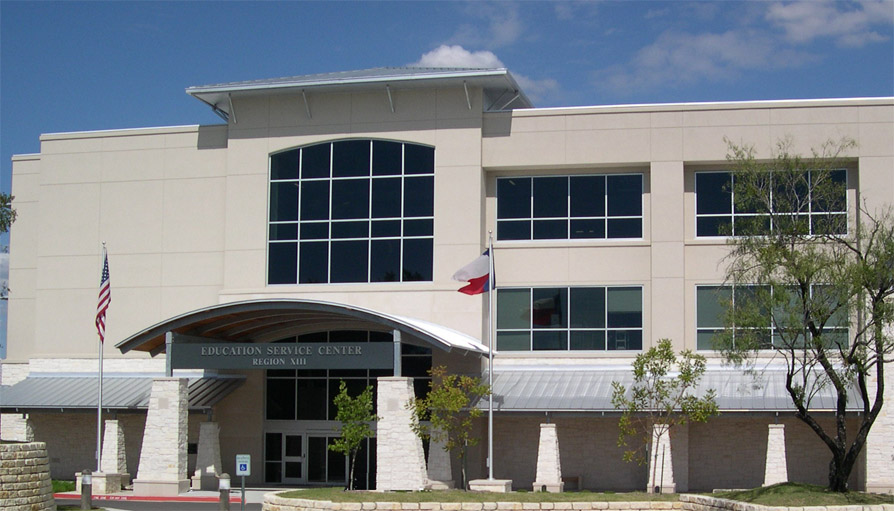
Education Service Center Region XIII in Austin

To serve the large number of independent school districts and charter schools in Texas, TEA is divided into 20 regions, each containing an Education Service Center (ESC, sometimes called regional service center or regional education service center).

Under Chapter 8 of the Texas Education Code, ESCs perform the following tasks on behalf of TEA:

- Assist school districts in improving student performance in each region of the system;
- Enable school districts to operate more efficiently and economically; and
- Implement initiatives assigned by the legislature or the commissioner.

The assistance applies to both districts and schools, including charter schools. Notably, the ESCs have no regulatory authority over districts or schools (TEA headquarters reserves this right to itself).

ESCs are not political units, and as such have no taxing authority. They are funded by state and federal funding, as well as by contracts made with independent school districts and schools.

== School and district accountability ==
=== Education performance rating ===
TEA rates schools and districts using the same four criteria. According to the TEA, the number of state schools and districts receiving the top ratings of "exemplary" and "recognized" increased from 2,213 in 2005 to 3,380 in 2006. Texas’ A–F school accountability system, introduced in 2017, aims to offer transparent information in three main areas: Student Achievement, School Progress, and Closing the Gaps. The 2023 ratings, which employ a revised methodology, provide families and districts with a clearer and more accurate understanding of school performance. This enhanced insight supports the assessment and ongoing development of educational initiatives. In 2020, all schools were given a "not rated" designator due to the COVID-19 pandemic. All Texas school districts were not rated due to the fact they were waived and was a "Declared State of Disaster" on April 2, 2020, by the ESSA or Every Student Succeeds Act.

The TEA defines campus as "an organizational unit operated by [a] school district that is eligible to receive a campus performance rating in the state accountability rating system." Multiple campuses may exist within the same building and receive independent ratings. For example, an elementary school and a middle school sharing the same facility would be evaluated separately.

=== Gold Performance acknowledgements ===
In addition to the state ranking, districts and schools can be awarded additional commendations (referred to as Gold Performance acknowledgements) for other noteworthy accomplishments not included in the ranking system. These different types of accomplishments are advanced enrollment, advanced baccalaureate results, attendance rate, and any other commended achievement that is not related to the accountability ratings. This award is given by the Commissioner of Education or determined by the Texas Education Code.

== Recent TEA takeovers ==
On October 23, 2025, Mike Morath, The Texas Agency Commissioner, declared that the TEA would be taking over Fort Worth ISD, including replacing the elected board of trustees with managers of the TEA's choosing. This decision was made because one campus received consecutive ratings that were deemed "inappropriate" under the TEA. This recent headline in that area prompted a meeting where the community and teachers voiced their concerns. The TEA had their Deputy Commission of Governance there to provide charts and data on why their agency believed this intervention was appropriate. On their page, TEA has a rating system where they address the process of appeals and a summary of reports for that following year.

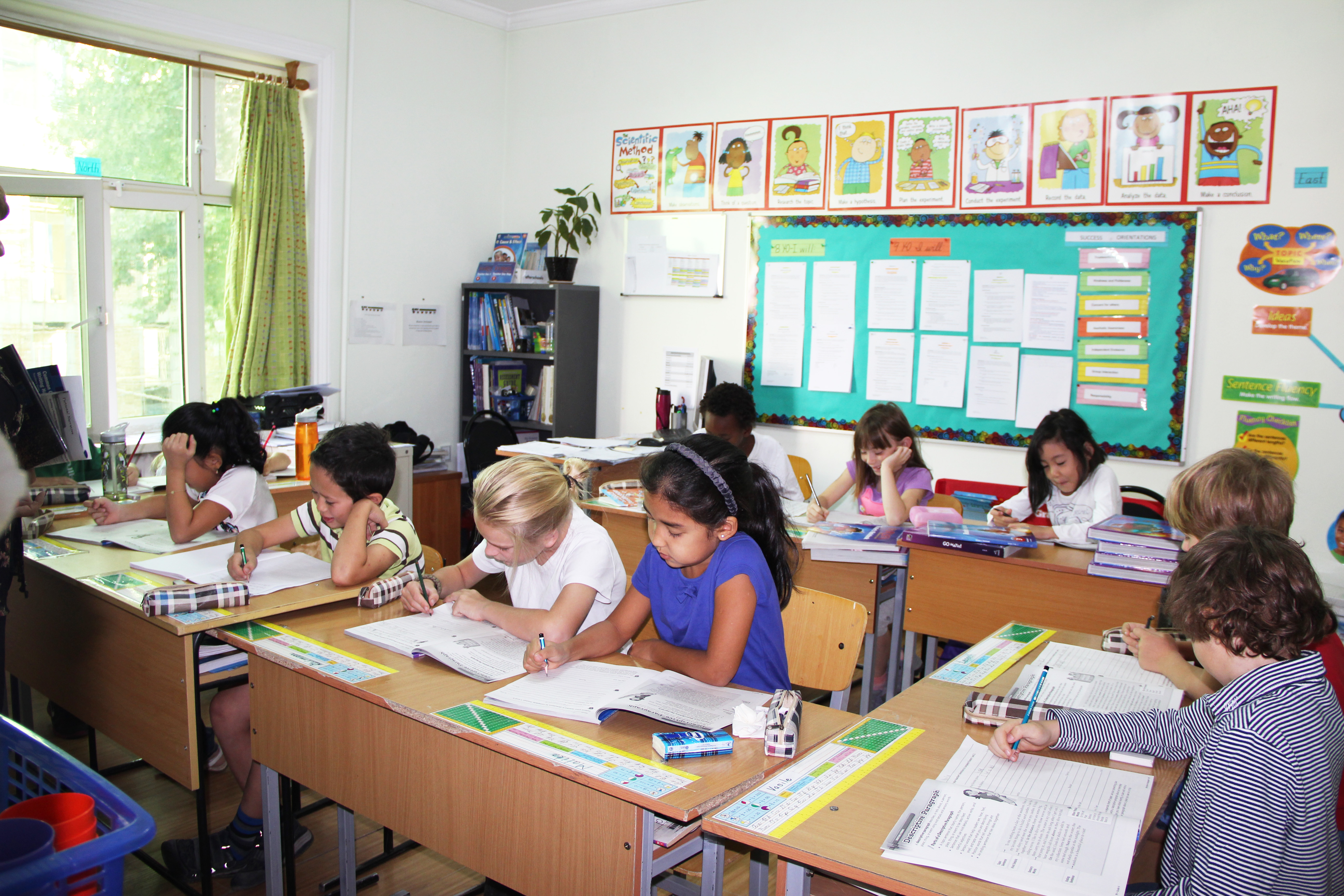

== Budget and enrollment ==
The Texas Education Agency is funded by the people of the State of Texas, at the direction of their elected legislature and with the consent of the Governor of Texas. The agency's budget must be approved on the legislature's biannual schedule. Revenues for the agency come from the state general fund (primarily sales taxes), the federal government, the Permanent School Fund (a sovereign wealth fund created by the state with revenues from public lands), and other sources.

Year (End of School Yr)	Budget, Totals ($) (Fiscal Yr)	Budget, Change ($) Cumulative (YoY)	Budget, Change (%) (OPY)	Enrollment, Totals (School EOY)	Enrollment, Change (%) (OPY)	State Funding ($) (per Pupil)	Funding, Change ($) Cumulative (per Pupil)
2024	*$39,995,879,467	*$14,859,776,852	▲21%	5,531,236	0.2%	▲$7,230.91	$2,351.94
2023	$31,735,150,183	$6,599,047,568	▼-2%	5,518,432	1.7%	▼$5,750.75	$871.78
2022	$32,380,636,621	$7,244,534,006	▼-47%	5,427,370	1.0%	▼$5,966.17	$1,087.20
2021	$47,741,601,219	$22,605,498,604	▲33%	5,371,586	-2.2%	▲$8,887.80	$4,008.83
2020	$32,163,713,656	$7,027,611,041	▲14%	5,493,940	1.1%	▲$5,854.40	$975.43
2019	$28,161,490,444	$3,025,387,829	▲2%	5,431,910	0.6%	▲$5,184.45	$305.48
2018	$27,698,128,088	$2,562,025,473	▲6%	5,399,682	0.8%	▲$5,129.59	$250.61
2017	$26,186,545,591	$1,050,442,976	▼-4%	5,359,127	1.1%	▼$4,886.35	$7.37
2016	$27,381,560,474	$2,245,457,859	▲5%	5,299,728	1.3%	▲$5,166.60	$287.62
2015	$26,112,248,988	$976,146,373	▲4%	5,232,065	1.6%	▲$4,990.81	$111.84
2014	$25,136,102,615	-	-	5,151,925	1.5%	$4,878.97	
2013	-		-	5,075,840	1.5	-	
2012	-		-	4,998,579	1.3	-	
2011	-		-	4,933,617	1.8	-	
2010	-		-	4,847,844	2.1	-	
2009	-		-	4,749,571	1.7	-	
2008	-		-	4,671,493	1.7	-	
2007	-		-	4,594,942	1.6	-	
2006	-		-	4,521,043	2.7	-	
2005	-		-	4,400,644	1.7	-	
2004	-		-	4,328,028	1.7	-	
2003	-		-	4,255,821	2.3	-	
2002	-		-	4,160,968	2.2	-	
2001	-		-	4,071,433	1.7	-	
2000	-		-	4,002,227	1.2	-	
1999	-		-	3,954,434	1.4	-	
1998	-		-	3,900,488	1.7	-	
1997	-		-	3,837,096	1.0	-	
1996	-		-	3,799,032	1.8	-	
1995	-		-	3,730,544	1.6	-	
1994	-		-	3,672,198	3.7	-	
1993	-		-	3,541,771	2.4	-	
1992	-		-	3,460,378	2.4	-	
1991	-		-	3,378,318	1.9	-	
1990	-		-	3,316,785	1.4	-	
1989	-		-	3,271,509	1.4	-	
1988	-		-	3,224,916	-	-	

* Budget figure is projection; all other years are actual expenditure as reported by TEA

== School safety ==
After the Uvalde school shooting, Governor Greg Abbott instructed state school safety and education officials to conduct random assessments on access control in Texas public and charter schools. In a letter dated June 1, 2022, Gov. Abbott emphasized the need to enhance and expand school safety measures in Texas following the Robb Elementary School tragedy. It highlights the efforts and trainings by the Texas School Safety Center (TxSSC) and outlines specific actions for school districts to improve safety and security. These actions include reviewing and updating emergency operations plans, training staff, conducting safety assessments, and ensuring compliance with state laws. The letter also mandates random inspections to test security measures and calls for legislative support to secure necessary resources. The overall goal is to instill a culture of constant vigilance and accountability across all Texas schools.

=== Office of School Safety and Security ===
A statutory addition from HB3 charged the agency with establishing the Office of School Safety and Security - a division consisting of individuals with substantial expertise and experience in school or law enforcement safety and security operations. The passage of this bill created Texas Education Code, Section. 37.1083 and 37.1084.

In a letter dated June 9, 2022, to Commissioner Morath, Governor Abbott emphasized the urgent need to prevent future tragedies like the one in Uvalde by enhancing school safety measures. Despite the comprehensive school safety and mental health legislation passed in 2019 and subsequent efforts, he stated that further actions were necessary before the next school year. Abbott called for the creation of a Chief of School Safety and Security within the Texas Education Agency (TEA) to coordinate efforts across various agencies and divisions, ensuring effective implementation of safety policies and best practices. This position was to report directly to the Commissioner and have a direct line to the Governor's Office, enhancing communication and collaboration without duplicating existing work. Abbott underscored the collective responsibility to provide a safe environment for all students, educators, and staff.

Governor Greg Abbott announced the appointment of John P. Scott as the new Chief of School Safety and Security within the Texas Education Agency (TEA) on October 3, 2022. This position was created following the tragedy at Robb Elementary School in Uvalde to ensure the implementation of school safety policies and best practices across Texas. Scott, who has an extensive background in security and intelligence, will report directly to Commissioner Mike Morath and have a direct line to the Governor's Office. He will coordinate safety efforts among multiple state agencies and school districts. Governor Abbott has also outlined significant actions to support the Uvalde community and enhance school safety statewide, including financial investments, mental health services, and legislative initiatives.

The mission of the Office of School Safety and Security is to build the capacity of the regional education service centers (ESCs) and local education agencies (LEAs) to promote the physical and psychological well-being of students and staff - recognizing that safer schools positively impact student outcomes. We align school safety and security expertise with guidance provided through technical assistance to ensure effective best practices are implemented across the state. The Office of School Safety and Security is divided in the monitoring and technical assistance division and the school readiness division.
