= Dallas Independent School District =

School district in Texas, United States

Address
- 9400 North Central Expressway Dallas, Texas, 75231; United States

District information
- Type: Public School
- Grades: Pre-K – 12th grade
- Established: July 21, 1884; 142 years ago
- President: Justin Henry
- Vice-president: Dan Micciche
- Superintendent: Stephanie S. Elizalde
- School board: 9 members
- Director of education: Shannon Trejo (Chief Academic Officer)
- Governing agency: Texas Education Agency
- Schools: Total 230 (2019-20): Elementary 147; Middle 35; High 38; Multi-level 10
- Budget: $2,225,086,608 (2021-22)

Students and staff
- Students: 155,861 (2019-20)
- Teachers: 10,428 (2019-20)
- Staff: 14,183 (2019-20)
- Student–teacher ratio: 15.02∶1 (2017-18)
- Athletic conference: UIL

Other information
- Website: www.dallasisd.org

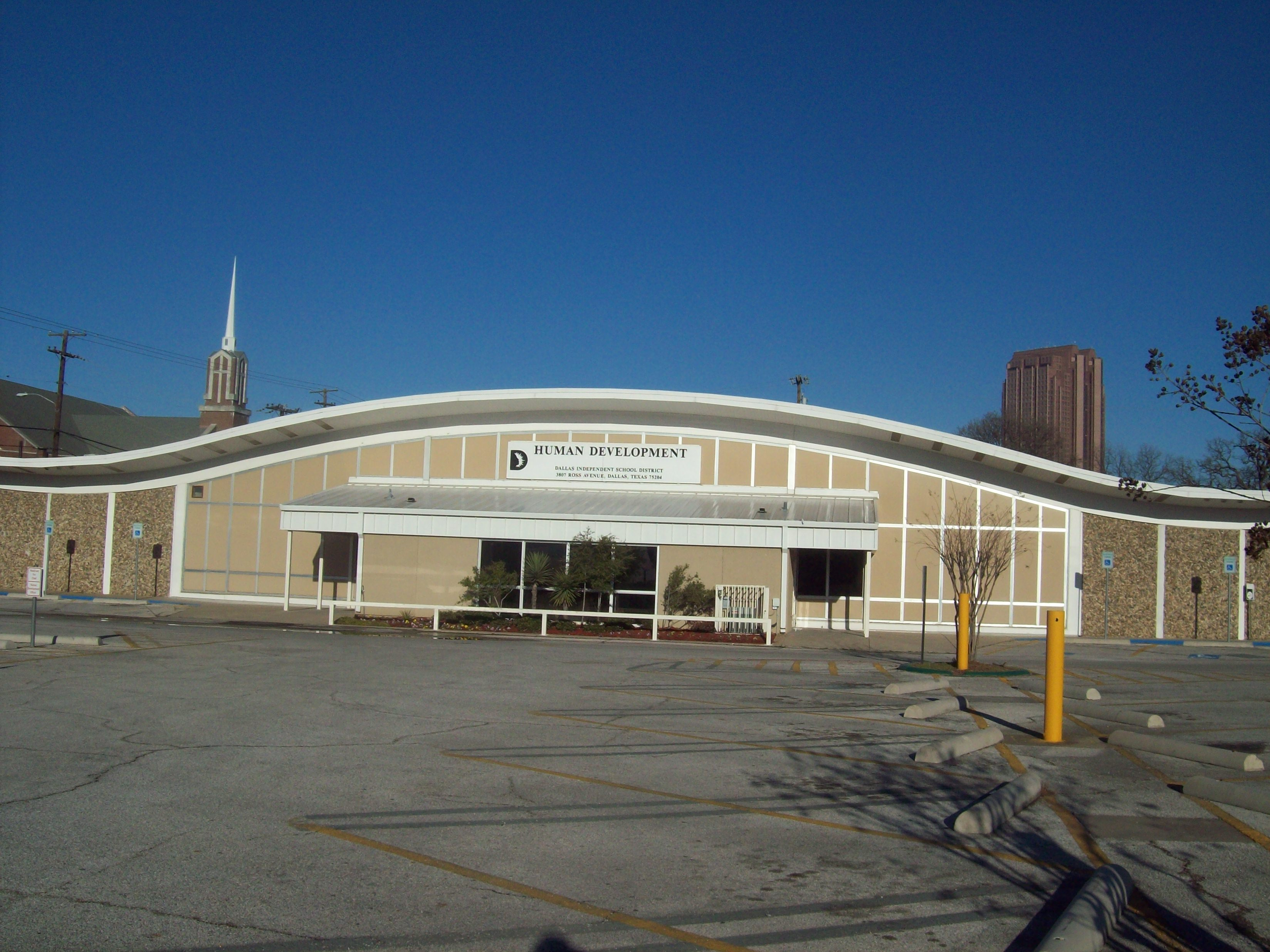
DISD Human Development Office

The Dallas Independent School District (Dallas ISD or DISD) is a school district based in Dallas, Texas, United States. It operates schools in much of Dallas County and is the second-largest school district in Texas and the seventeenth-largest in the United States. During the 1990s, the district branded itself as Dallas Public Schools (DPS).

As of 2017, the school district was rated "as having met the standard" by the Texas Education Agency.

== History ==
=== 1800s ===
The Dallas public school district in its current form was first established in Dallas in 1884, although there is evidence that public schools had existed for Dallas prior to that date. Mayor W. L. Cabell ordered just one month after the June 16, 1884, district founding that "all former Ordinances in relation to the city public school are hereby repealed," and the district's 1884–85 superintendent, a Mr. Boles, had enrollment figures for each year from 1880 through his own tenure;

The Dallas Directory of 1873 expressed regret that "there are no public schools in Dallas," while the 1875 Directory said that "the schools are near perfection."

The 1884 organizational meeting coincides with changes in statewide education law establishing a system of school districts, each to be assigned its own number, with the ability to levy taxes and raise funds as well as to determine the length of school terms and other educational decisions. The state superintendent of schools, Benjamin M. Baker, praised the new law's abandonment of tying teachers' salaries to the number of pupils attending, a practice he called "a relic of barbarism."

By 1884, six schools were operating. Four were designated for "whites" and two for "colored/black", as school segregation was the legal policy in Texas at the time. Booker T. Washington High School is one of these original schools, beginning as "Colored School No. 2" in 1884 and adopting its later name in 1902.

=== School District Expansion ===
Dallas ISD has annexed many schools and school districts throughout its history:

- 1920: Lagow Independent School, a one-room school attended only by the Lagow children and one other family; a quitclaim deed signed by the Lagow heirs and the property sold
- 1922: Maple Lawn ISD
- 1926: Irwindell ISD
- 1927: Greenland Hills Territory; Gould School District, a one-teacher school; West Dallas ISD
- 1928: Lisbon School District; Bluff View Estates; Love Field; Cockrell Hill School District; Eagle Ford Common School District; Beeman Common School District; Fair Grounds Common School District; Arcadia Park Shale; Bonnie View Common School District; Cement City ISD
- 1929: Floyd Common School District #60
- 1937: Vickery Common School District
- 1945: Bayles Common School District #59; Reinhardt Common School District; Pleasant Mound ISD; Vickery ISD
- 1946: Walnut Hill Common School District #79; Letot Common School District #7
- 1948: Vickery Independent School District (adding Vickery Meadows)
- 1949: Parts of the Lake Highlands area, from Richardson ISD
- 1952: Scyene Common School District; Union Bower School District #50
- 1954: Farmers Branch ISD; Addison ISD; Wheatland Common School District; and territory from Mesquite ISD
- 1954: Pleasant Grove Independent School District was annexed in 1954 (adding Pleasant Grove)
- 1954: Pleasant Grove High School was replaced by Samuell High School
- 1959: Territory from Lancaster ISD; Rylie ISD; territory from Grand Prairie ISD
- 1960: Buckner ISD
- 1963: Parts of Garland ISD
- 1965: Seagoville ISD of Seagoville

The school system expanded from offering 11 grades to a modern 12-year program as of 1941. Initially, the change was resisted by families who felt the additional year would be too expensive, though others promoted the addition of a further year of athletics and some anticipated an ability for gifted students to finish the 12-year program in as little as 10.5 years, although that hope did not prove a reality.

The period from 1946 to 1966 saw construction of schools, with 97 of the district's school buildings erected during this period, at a peak of 17 schools in 1956 alone.

=== Desegregation ===
School desegregation in Texas did not begin for nearly six years after the United States Supreme Court made its May 17, 1954, Brown v. Board of Education decision, nullifying the previous doctrine of "separate but equal" public facilities. The Dallas school board commissioned studies over the next several months, deciding in August 1956, that desegregation was premature and that the segregated system would stay in place for 1956–57.

In 1957, Texas passed legislation requiring that districts not integrate their schools unless district residents voted to approve the change. An August 1960, election for this purpose ended with voters rejecting desegregation. Meanwhile, a lawsuit was filed by the district against the state superintendent on August 13, 1958, with the goal of a resolution of conflicts between federal and state courts on the subject of integration.

In 1960, the district initially adopted a plan to desegregate grade by grade, starting with the 1961 first-grade class, and proceed year by year until desegregation had been achieved. The plan was amended only weeks later to provide for movement of students at parent request.

On September 1, 1965, the elementary schools were ordered to be desegregated, initially to be followed by the junior high schools in 1966 and the senior high schools in 1967; however, the Fifth Circuit United States Court issued an order on September 7 that led to amending the ruling so that all twelve grades must be desegregated as of September 1, 1965. A book on the history of DISD published the following year by the school district made the statement, "Desegregation of the Dallas Schools was accomplished in the course of ten short years with a minimum of commotion and stress ... [due to] the patient and sympathetic understanding ... and the flinty determination of the School Board ... to serve the public in their lawfully constituted duty." In September 1967 Dallas ISD states that its schools were desegregated. However, lawsuits against the district from parents of Black children continued for decades.

During one desegregation lawsuit in the 1970s, a judge suggested that students from different schools could interact via television instead of forcing desegregation busing in the district. The parties filing suit did not like the plan. After the forced busing desegregation, in the 1970s many white students and families withdrew from district schools en masse.

While DISD believed it had complied with the Brown ruling from 1954, Sam Tasby of Love Field disagreed. He had to send his two children several miles to an all-Black school, despite there being an all-White school within walking distance of his house. On October 6, 1970, Tasby filed a lawsuit against DISD claiming that the school district continued to operate a segregated system.

Tasby's challenge wound its way through the courts over the next 33 years, eventually getting passed to Judge Barefoot Sanders. After a series of hearings, Judge Sanders found that DISD continued to show signs of segregation and constituted the Desegregation Plan for the Dallas Independent School District.

In August 1983, the DISD school board finally ended its fight against court-ordered desegregation by unanimously accepting the Fifth Circuit's upholding of Judge Sanders's desegregation plan. From that time on, DISD would remain under Sanders's oversight until he declared it desegregated.

In June 2003, 49 years after Brown v. Board was decided, Judge Sanders ruled that Dallas ISD was desegregated and no longer subject to his oversight.

=== 1990s and 2000s ===
In 1996, DISD announced that it would en masse rezone many areas to different schools. DISD officials said that the rezoning, which would affect over 40 campuses, would be the largest such rezoning since at least the 1950s.

In the summer of 2005, the Texas Education Agency (TEA) ordered the Wilmer-Hutchins Independent School District closed for the 2005–2006 school year due to financial stress and reported mismanagement. After negotiations, Dallas ISD agreed to accept the students for the 2005–2006 school year. The Wilmer-Hutchins ISD district was absorbed into Dallas ISD in summer 2006.

Dallas ISD opened 11 new campuses in the fall of 2006. The district incorporated the WHISD territory via "Plan K," adopted on November 30, 2006.

From 2005 to 2007, several northwest Dallas area public schools under Dallas ISD jurisdiction became infamous due to the outbreak of a Dallas-area recreational drug, a version of heroin mixed with Tylenol PM, called "cheese," which led to several deaths of Dallas-area youths. Dallas ISD issued drug dog searches to schools in order to combat the problem.

Dallas ISD was reported in April 2008 to have the 7th highest dropout rate of any urban school district in the US.

Circa 2012 the district was shutting down some schools in central Dallas which had enrollment declines, while it was building new schools in outlying areas of the district, which had population increases. That year five schools were opening, with most of them in Southeast Dallas and Seagoville. The district planned to close eleven schools in the same year; the income levels in the neighborhoods hosting the closing schools tended to be very low and student populations had consistently declined. Of the nine board members, the vote was six to two in favor of closing with one abstention.

By 2016 the district was expanding the use of two-way bilingual programs, with 24 schools of 51 two-way bilingual programs beginning that year.

Effective July 1, 2018, four elementary schools originally named for confederate generals were renamed:

- William L. Cabell Elementary in Farmers Branch became Chapel Hill Preparatory School
- Stonewall Jackson Elementary in Lower Greenville, Dallas became Mockingbird Elementary
- Albert Sidney Johnston Elementary became Cedar Crest Elementary
- Robert E. Lee Elementary in Lower Greenville became Geneva Heights Elementary

=== COVID-19 Pandemic ===
During the COVID-19 pandemic in Texas, in 2021 the DISD board voted to require masks, contradicting Governor of Texas Greg Abbott's order to disallow school districts in the state from having mask mandates. Despite the Texas Supreme Court stating that Abbott had the authority to remove mask mandates, Dallas ISD kept its mask mandate in place.

=== Data Breach ===
On August 8, 2021, Dallas ISD suffered a data breach affecting the information of students and employees from 2010 to 2021.

Data from the 2019–2020 school year indicated that 52 percent of students suspended from the Dallas ISD were African American, and 2.4 percent were white. In response, the district stopped using suspensions as a disciplinary practice in 2021, instead sending suspended students to "reset centers".

== Superintendents ==
A partial list of past DISD superintendents

- Stephanie Elizalde, July 2022 to present
- Michael Hinojosa, October 2015 to July 2022
- Mike Miles, July 1, 2012, to June 25, 2015
- Alan King (interim) - June 2011 to July 2012
- Michael Hinojosa, May 12, 2005, to June 30, 2011
- Larry Groppel (interim) - September 2004 to May 2005
- Mike Moses, January 1, 2001, to August 31, 2004
- Robert Payton (interim) - July to December 2000
- Waldemar "Bill" Rojas, August 1, 1999, to July 5, 2000
- James H. Hughey, acting from September 24, 1997; appointed superintendent May 1998 to August 1999
- Yvonne Gonzalez, January 9 to September 17, 1997
- Chad Woolery, December 1, 1993, to August 5, 1996
- Marvin Edwards June 1988 to April 1993
- Otto M. Fridia (interim) - November 1987 to May 1988
- Linus Wright August 1978 to October 1987
- Nolan Estes 1968 to 1978
- Warren T. White 1946 to 1968

The first superintendent of the Dallas school system was W. A. Boles, elected in August 1884.

== General information ==
=== Headquarters ===
Its headquarters is 9400 N. Central Expressway in North Dallas. It moved there beginning in 2017. The anticipated date for fully moving in was in January 2018.

The previous headquarters, 3700 Ross, is an Art Deco building that was built in the 1950s. DISD architectural consultant Mark Lemmon was the designer. Robert Wilonsky in The Dallas Morning News stated in 2017 that while other buildings around it were changed by gentrification, the DISD headquarters was "a rare, defiant survivor".

In April 2016, trustees approved a plan to purchase the 9400 NCX office building on Central Expressway in North Dallas. This was done to consolidate various school district offices which had been scattered around the city previously. In the process, school trustees voted in February 2017 to sell various surplus properties; among them, the district's Ross Avenue headquarters complex. Permits were filed by the buyer of the longtime headquarters building, in April 2017, to tear down the complex; this was a cause of concern for local preservationists. In December 2017 Leon Capital Group, the new owner of 3700 Ross, stated it wanted to preserve a part of the building; a five-story luxury apartment complex is being built on the majority of the four-acre site with 16,000 square feet (1,500 m^{2}) of the former building preserved. Ultimately that one section of the Ross Street building was preserved with the remainder demolished. Demolition of the Ross Street facility began in December 2017.

=== Location and area ===
Dallas ISD covers 312.6 square miles (809.6 km^{2}) of land (map) and most of the city of Dallas. The district also serves Cockrell Hill, most of Seagoville and Addison, Wilmer, most of Hutchins, and portions of the following cities:

- Balch Springs
- Carrollton
- Combine
- Dallas
- DeSoto
- Duncanville
- Farmers Branch
- Garland
- Highland Park
- Lancaster
- Mesquite
- University Park

In addition, Dallas ISD covers unincorporated areas of Dallas County, including some other surrounding areas, including those with Ferris addresses.

== Curriculum ==
Teachers in the district created an African-American studies class, which includes information on African countries prior to 1619.

== School uniforms ==
Dallas ISD implemented mandatory school uniforms for all elementary and middle school students (through 8th grade) on most campuses starting in the 2005–2006 school year.

Elementary and middle school campuses which do not follow the Dallas ISD uniform policy continue to use their own mandatory uniform codes, which were adopted prior to the 2005–2006 school year.

Uniforms are optional at the high school level as in schools decide whether to adopt uniform policies; eight traditional high schools and three alternative high schools have adopted them.

The Texas Education Agency specified that the parents and/or guardians of students zoned to a school with uniforms may apply for a waiver to opt out of the uniform policy so their children do not have to wear the uniform; parents must specify "bona fide" reasons, such as religious reasons or philosophical objections.

== Relations with other agencies ==
Angela Shah of The Dallas Morning News said in 2004, "Even as many big cities move aggressively to bolster public education, City Hall's relationship with Dallas' largest school district remains informal at best."

== LGBT relations ==
Jose Plata, an openly gay DISD board member, and Pat Stone, the president of the Dallas Parents and Friends of Lesbians and Gays (PFLAG), advocated for adding LGBT students to the anti-discrimination ordinance. In 1996 the DISD board of education voted to add LGBT individuals to the ordinance, and by 1997 the district had created a pamphlet for LGBT students.

Some high school campuses in DISD house Gay–straight alliance organizations.

== Athletic facilities ==
Athletic facilities controlled by DISD include P.C. Cobb Athletic Complex in the Fair Park Arena, Forester Athletic Complex in southeast Dallas, Franklin Stadium in North Dallas (north of NorthPark Center), Jesse Owens Memorial Complex (southeast of Interstate 20) including the John Kincaide Stadium, Alfred J. Loos Athletic Complex in Addison, Pleasant Grove Stadium in southeast Dallas, Seagoville Stadium in Seagoville, Sprague Athletic Complex in southwest Dallas, and Wilmer-Hutchins Eagle Stadium in Hutchins.

== Student makeup ==
As of 2015 some of the wealthiest neighborhoods in the central city area are actually in the Highland Park Independent School District (HPISD), not DISD. The student body of DISD has a higher percentage of Hispanics, a slightly lower percentage of non-Hispanic Whites, and a higher percentage of low income students compared to the Houston Independent School District (HISD), which includes some of the wealthiest neighborhoods in central Houston. In 2010 DISD had a higher number of black students in its boundaries attending charter schools compared to HISD, even though HISD had more black students living in its boundaries.

Dallas ISD Enrollment Data 2017–2018
| Grade | Number of students | Percent |
|---|---|---|
| Early childhood education & Pre-kindergarten | 12,679 | 8% |
| Elementary School (K-5) | 72,284 | 46% |
| Middle School (6-8) | 31,759 | 20% |
| High School (9-12) | 40,110 | 26% |

Dallas ISD Ethnicity Data 2017–2018
| Ethnicity | Number of students | Percent |
|---|---|---|
| Hispanic | 109,228 | 69.6% |
| African American | 35,340 | 23.5% |
| White | 8,402 | 5.4% |
| American Indian or Alaska Native | 91 | 0.3% |
| Native Hawaiian/Other or Pacific Islander | 96 | 0.1% |
| Asian | 2,139 | 1.4% |
| Two or More Races | 1,136 | 0.7% |

=== Demographic history ===
In 1968 DISD had 159,527 students, with 52% of them being Anglo whites. In 1970 the district had 94,383 Anglo white students. In 1973, half of DISD's students were White. As time passed, the White population decreased due to private schools and white flight. In the fall of 1978 there were 132,061 students, with 34% of them being white. By 1979 there were 42,030 Anglo White students.

In the 1980s and 1990s the DISD student body was majority black. In 2000 almost 161,000 students were enrolled, with 52% being Hispanic, 38% being black, and 9% being white. That year 73% of the students were on free or reduced-price lunches, meaning they were classified as being from socioeconomically poor families. As of 2003, DISD was 58% Hispanic, 34% African American, 6% White, and 2% Asian and Native American. As of that year, 190 DISD schools were 90% or more combined black and Hispanic, 37 schools were 90% or more Hispanic, and 24 schools were 90% or more black. White flight continued into the 2000s and 2010s, as there was a 55% decrease in the white student population from 1997 to 2015. In 2008 the Anglo White student population bottomed at 7,207, and the decline stopped afterward. In 2010 157,000 students were in DISD schools, with 68% being Hispanic, 26% being black, and 5% being white. From 2000 to 2010 the number of Hispanic students had increased by 23,000, an increase by 7%; while the number of black students had declined by 19,000, a 31% decrease. That year, 87% of DISD students were on free or reduced-price lunches. Eric Nicholson of the Dallas Observer wrote that by 2016 the number of Anglo whites was "actually increasing slightly — very slightly — over the past couple of years."

In 2009 the State of Texas defined "college readiness," or readiness to undergo university studies, of high school graduates by scores on the ACT and SAT and in the 11th grade Texas Assessment of Knowledge and Skills (TAKS) tests. Holly K. Hacker of The Dallas Morning News said that DISD schools "showed extreme highs and lows in college readiness." Regarding the selective DISD magnet schools, Hacker said that they "prepare virtually all graduates for college." Throughout the DFW metroplex, the highest college readiness rates were found in the School of Science & Engineering and the School for the Talented & Gifted. Hacker said "[t]hough they serve some students with lower incomes, the campuses have a huge advantage because they accept only those with high test scores."

By 2016 the growth in the number of low income students, previously significant, had stopped.

=== Demographics by racial group ===
Enrollment in Dallas Independent School District by Race, 2023
| White | 5.6% |
| African American | 19.7% |
| Hispanic | 70.4% |
| American Indian | 0.3% |
| Asian American | 1.3% |
| Multiracial | 1.8% |
| Other and undeclared | 1.0% |

As of 2003, some schools in DISD still had significant numbers of White American students. Usually they were up to 15-20% of a school's given population. Many schools with significant White populations were in the East Dallas and North Dallas areas and mostly white sections of Oak Cliff, such as Kessler Park. Elementary schools that had significant White populations included Nathan Adams, Hexter, Lakewood, Mockingbird (formerly Stonewall Jackson) Elementary, Pershing, W.B. Travis Vanguard & Academy, Preston Hollow, and Harry Withers. Middle schools with significant White populations included Franklin, and Long middle schools. High schools with significant White populations included Hillcrest, W.T. White, and Woodrow Wilson. Seagoville High School and its feeder schools also had white populations. Circa 2016 the white population consistently made up 5% of the DISD student body. In 2016 Nicholson wrote that "By the end, DISD's Anglo exodus could be rationalized as a response not to racial mixing but to concentrated poverty, flagging test scores and an inept administration perennially mired in scandal."

From 2000 to 2010 the number of black students decreased by 20,000. In 2010 that was the lowest in the post-1965 history of DISD. One reason for the decline in the percentage of black students is the move of black people to suburbs; they did so due to a perception that public schools there have a higher quality than those in DISD, as well as general desires for higher quality housing and lower crime environments. Another reason was the growth in charter schools which take students who would otherwise attend DISD schools; in 2010 5,900 black students attending charter schools in the area lived in the DISD boundaries. Other reasons for the decline in the percentage of black students included a perception that DISD has moved its focus away from black students and towards Hispanic students, and the fact that many Hispanics have moved into traditionally black neighborhoods.

== Schools ==
The district has high schools, middle schools, elementary schools, and multi-level schools.

=== School photographs ===
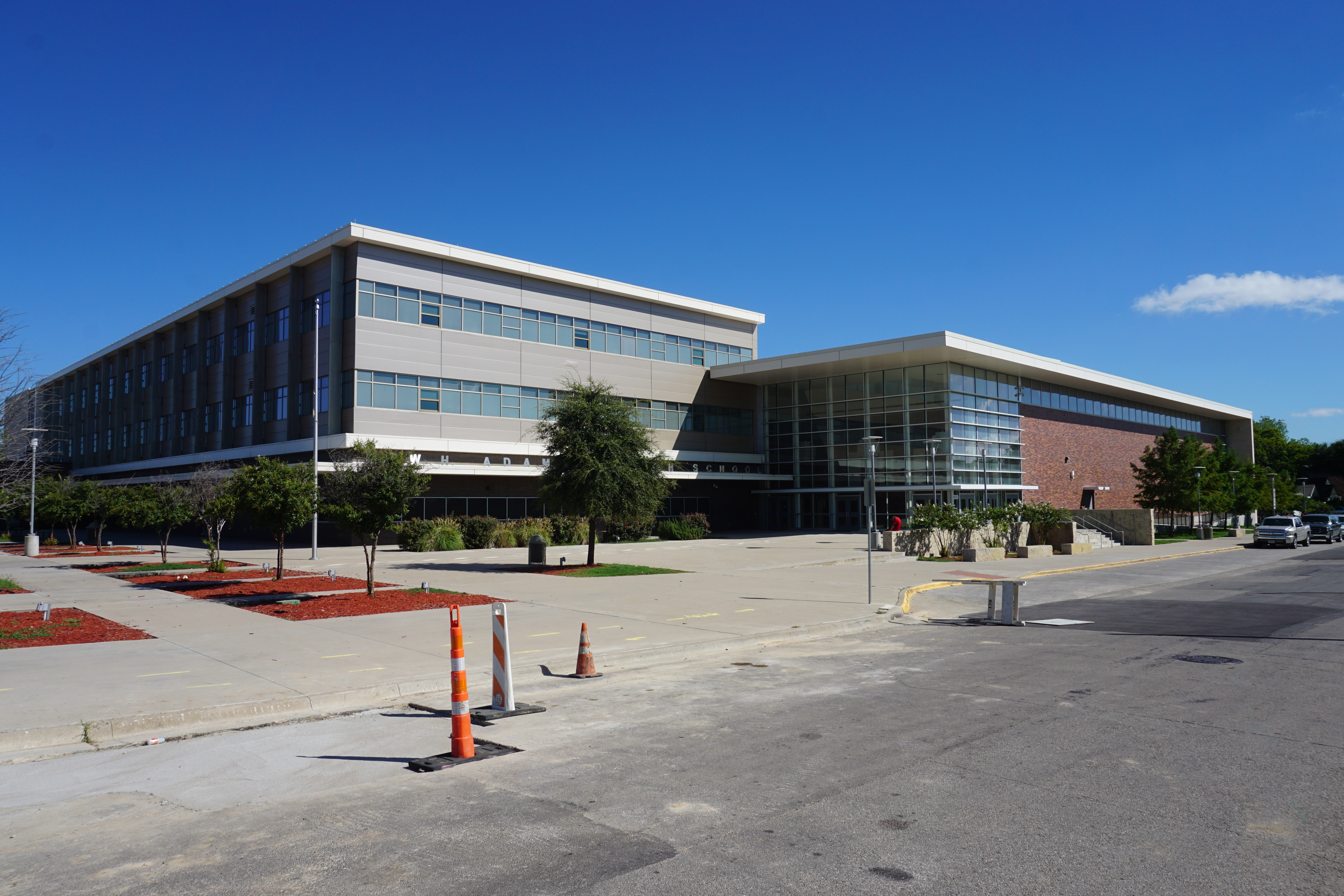
W. H. Adamson High School

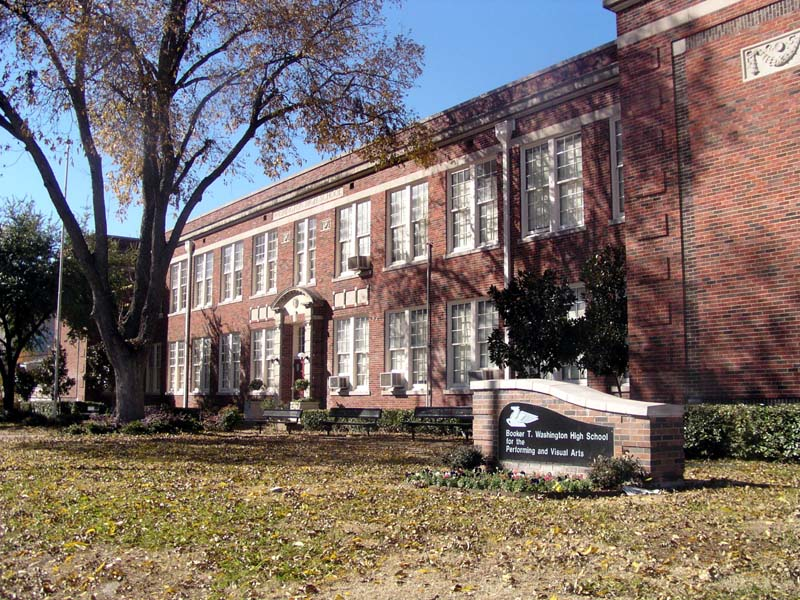
Booker T. Washington High School for the Performing and Visual Arts

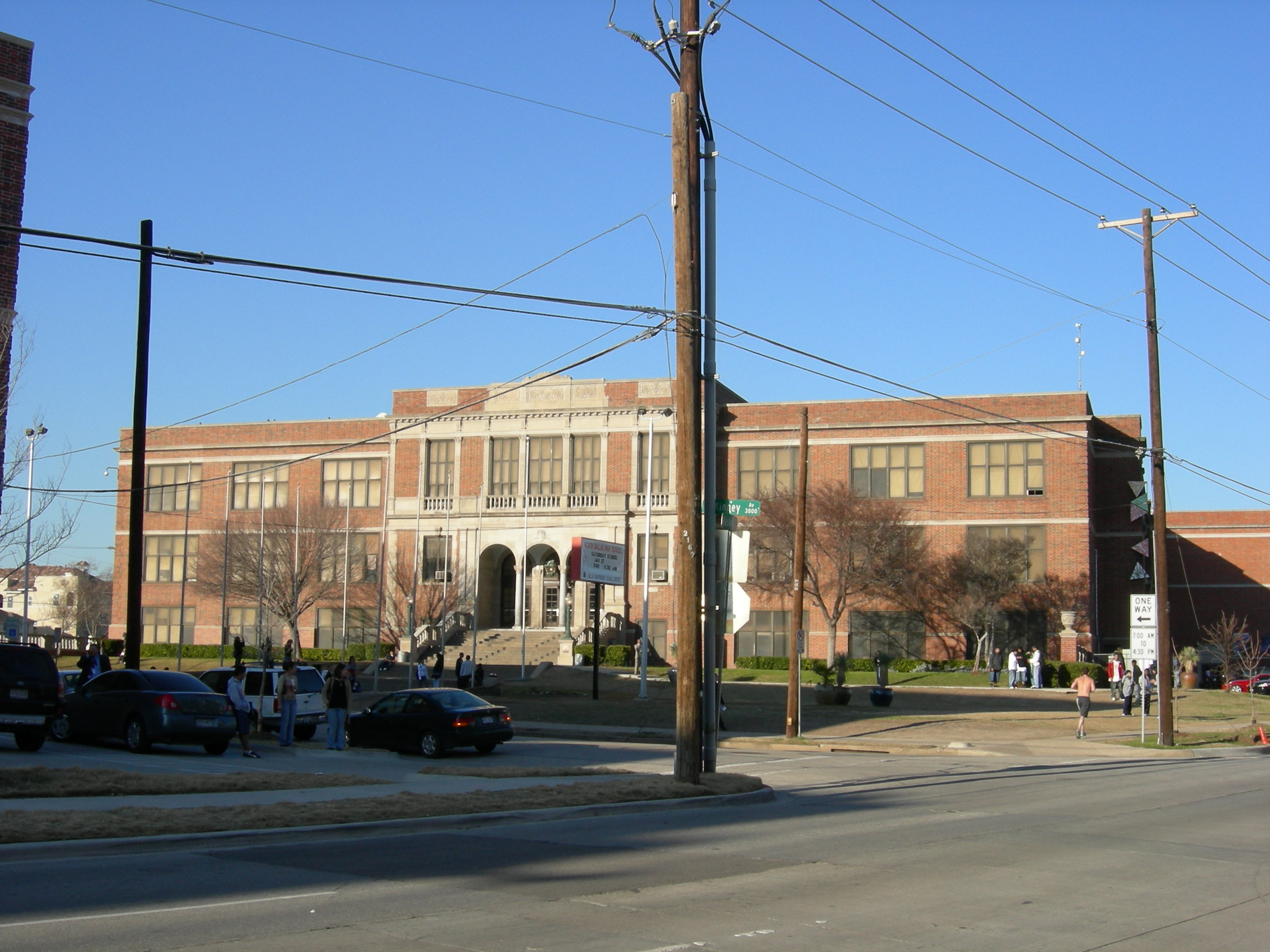
North Dallas High School

W. W. Samuell High School

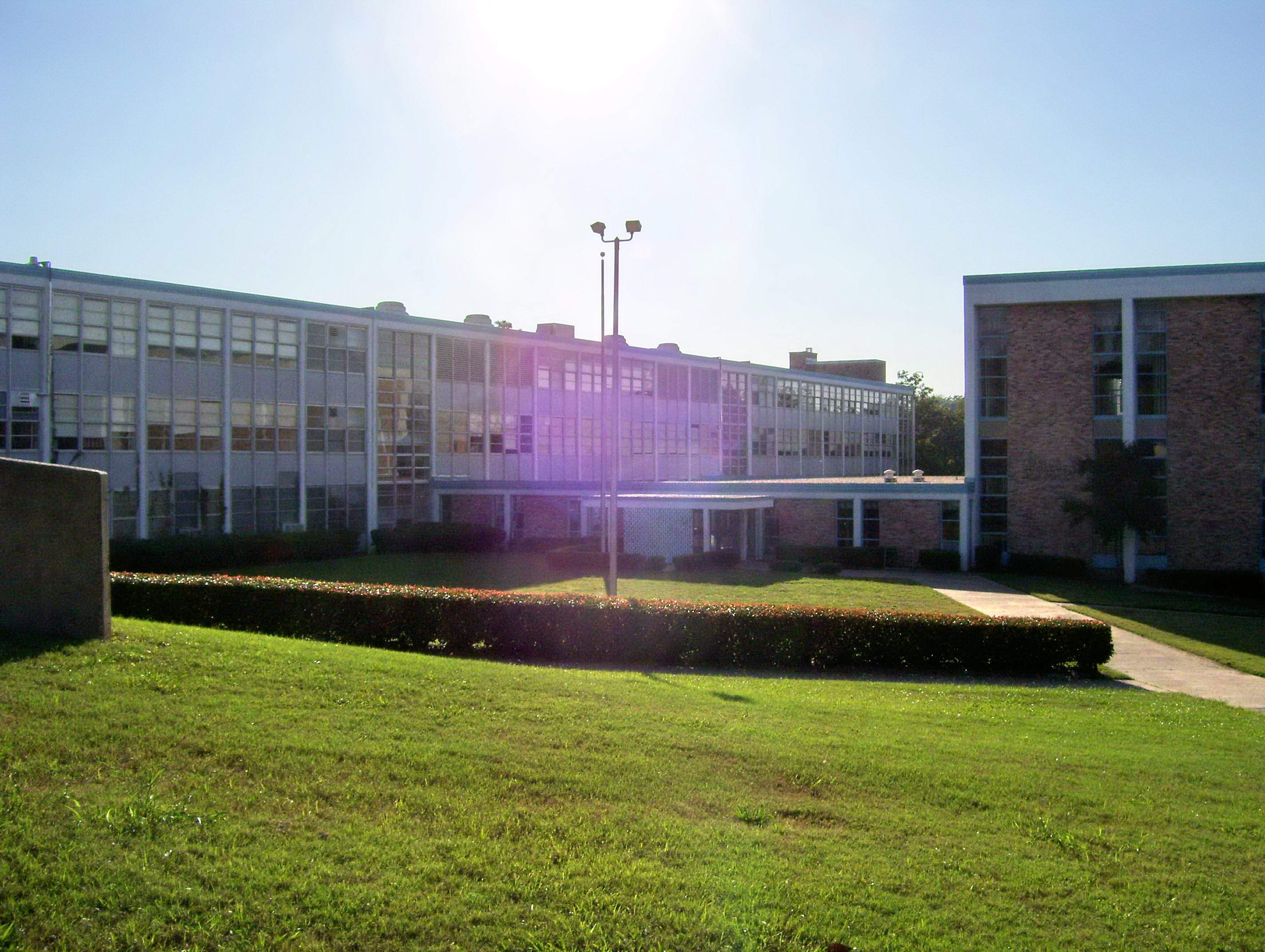
Franklin D. Roosevelt High School

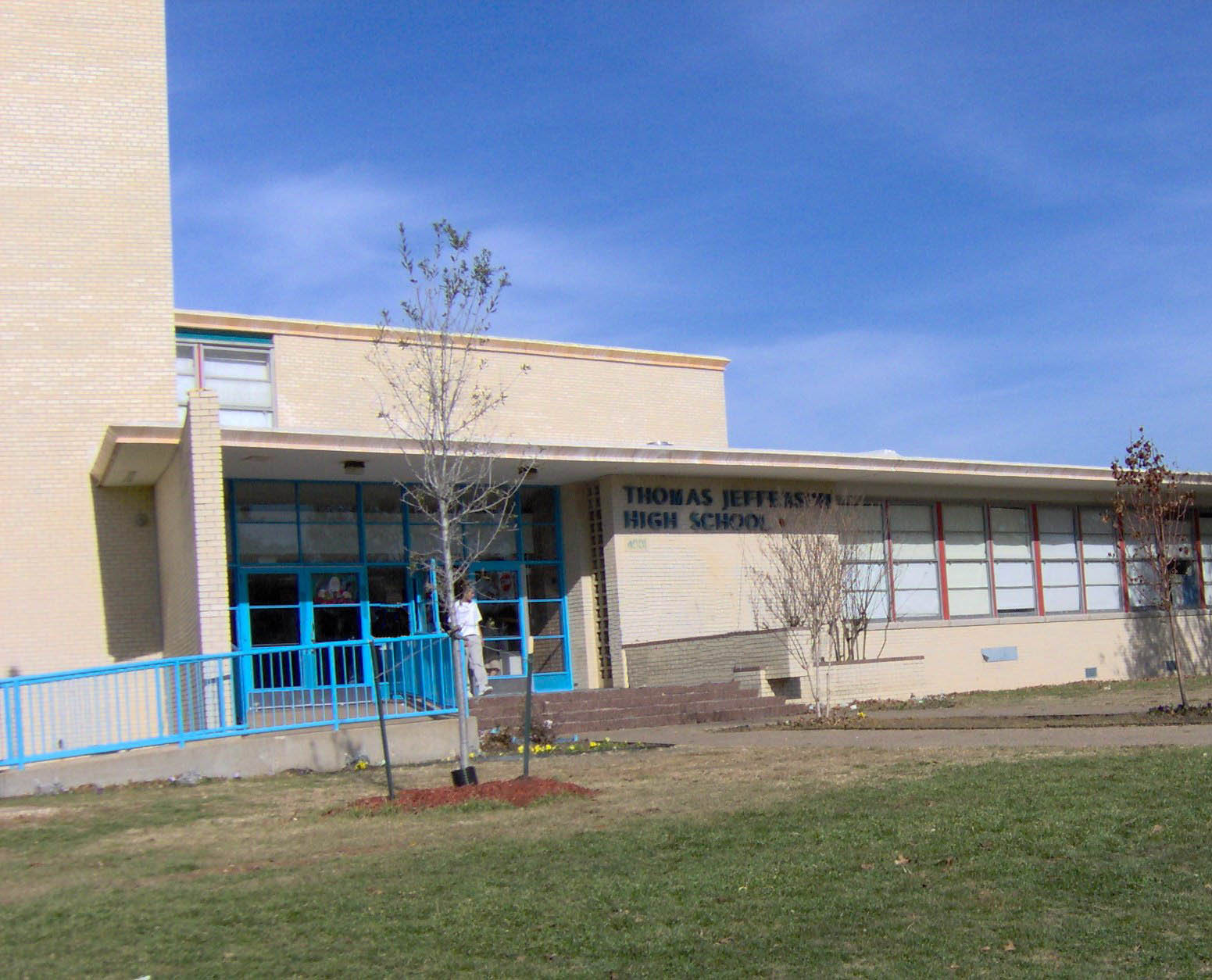
Thomas Jefferson High School

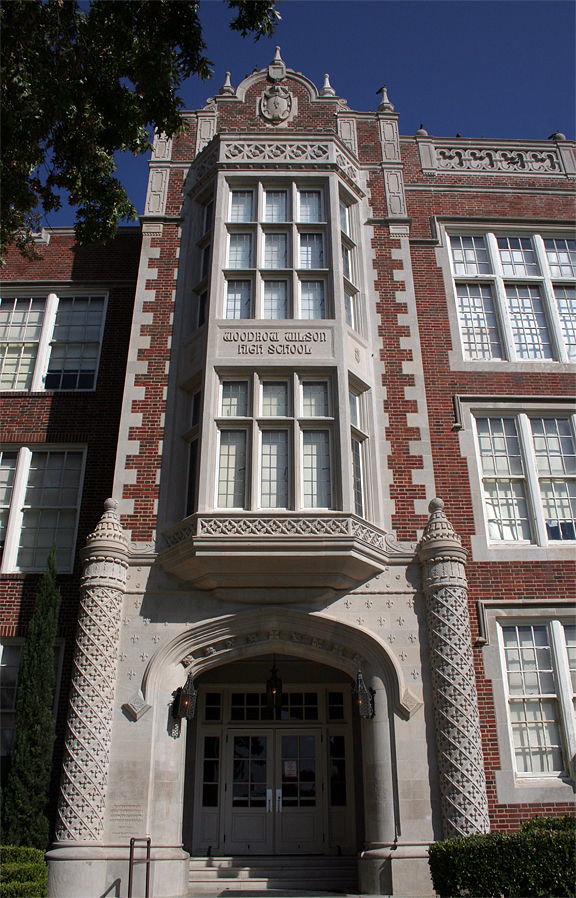
Woodrow Wilson High School

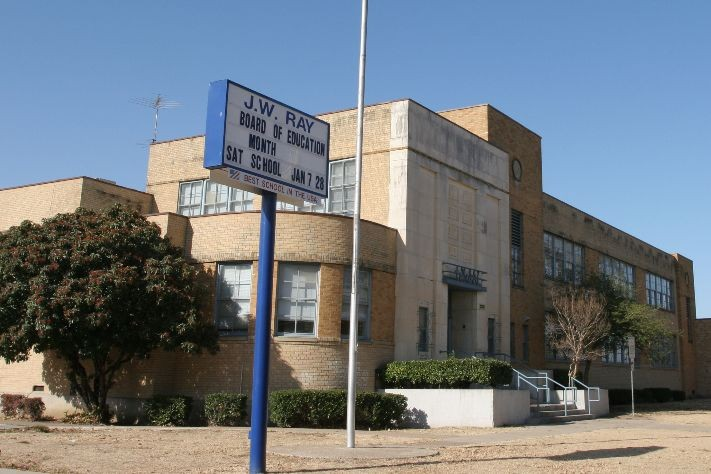
Ignite Middle School at J.W. Ray

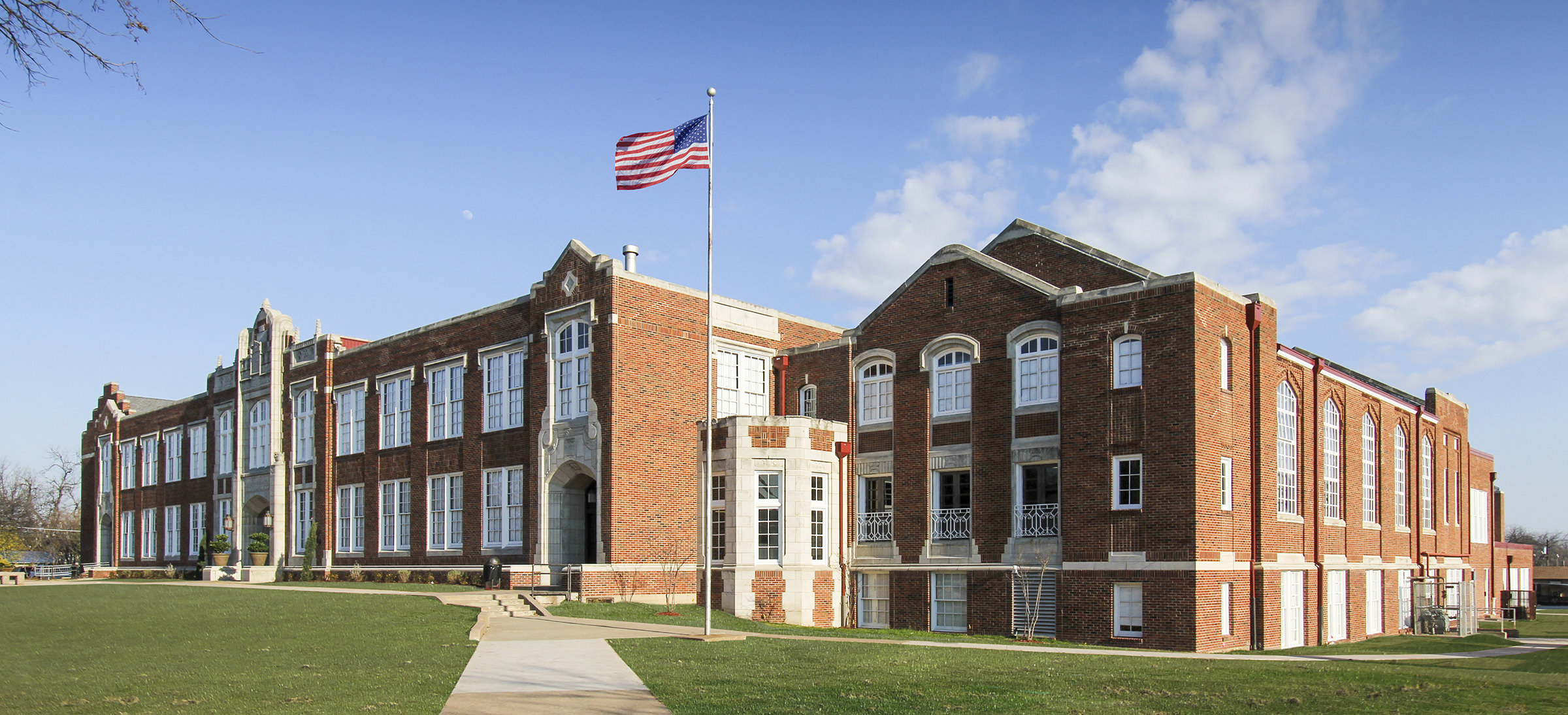
J.L. Long Middle School

== See also ==
- List of school districts in Texas
