= Tenth Street Freedman's Town =

- Tenth Street Historic District
- U.S. National Register of Historic Places
- U.S. Historic district
- Dallas Landmark
- 11 Most Endangered Historic Places 2019
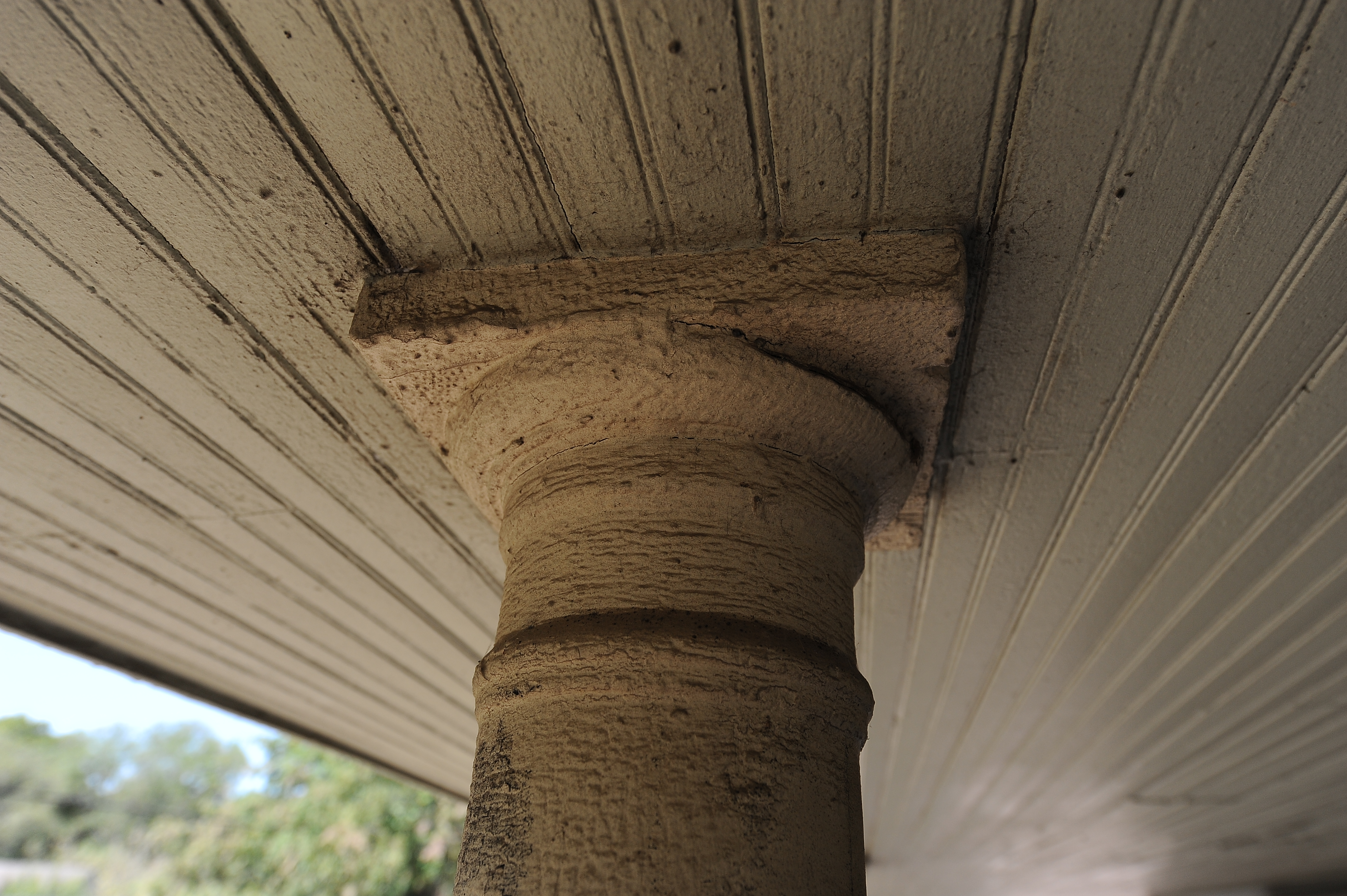
- Porches define the character of historic Tenth Street.

- Location within Texas Location within the United States
- Location: Western edge of William S. Beatty Survey, Northeast corner William H. Hord Survey, Southeast corner Elizabeth Robertson Survey, Dallas, Texas
- Coordinates: 32°44′56″N 96°48′24″W
- Area: Approximately 84 acres (34 ha)
- Built: 1888-1947
- Architect: African American carpenters including Noah Penn, Richard J. Moore, and John Siler, among many others.
- Architectural style: Folk Victorian, Late 19th and 20th Century Revivals, American Craftsman, Shotgun House, Bungalow
- NRHP reference No.: 94000604

Significant dates
- Added to NRHP: June 17, 1994
- Designated DLMK: 1993
- Designated EMEHP: May 30, 2019

The Tenth Street Freedman's Town is a historic African American community in the Oak Cliff section of Dallas, Texas. A freedmen's town is a community settled by formerly enslaved people who were emancipated during and after the American Civil War. The freedmen's town that became known as Tenth Street began near the confluence of Cedar Creek and Cedar Creek Branch, at the foot of an African American burial ground dating back to 1846. The name "Tenth Street" became associated with the community in 1887, when John Scarborough Armstrong and Thomas Lafayette Marsalis platted the town of Oak Cliff.

== Heritage designations ==
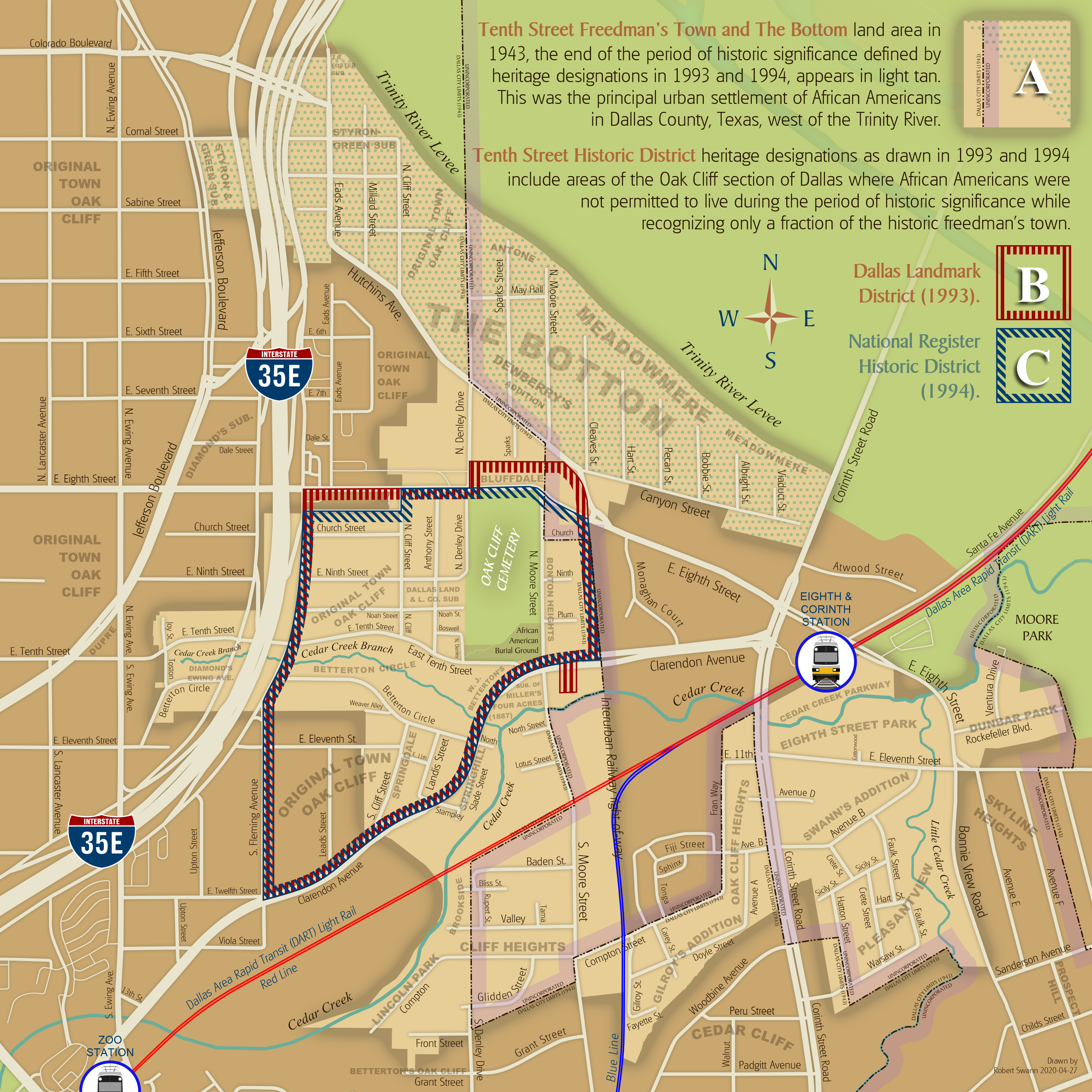
A: Total area of African American settlement comprising Greater Tenth Street and The Bottom at the zenith of pre-World War II expansion, fifty years before heritage designation. Approximately 300 acres. Historic Designations identified as Tenth Street Historic District: B: Dallas landmark district (designated 1993). Approximately 87 acres. The Dallas landmark district includes approximately 69 acres of the 300 acres defined as Area A above, comprising 79% of the landmark district and 23% of African American district during the period of historic significance. C: National Register of Historic Places Historic District (designated 1994). Note: Hatched areas lying outside of Area A consist of age-appropriate structures not occupied by African Americans during period of historic significance but included in one or both historic district designations. These areas were off limits to African American residents of Tenth Street and The Bottom during the Jim Crow Era.

Tenth Street Historic District may identify either a Dallas Landmark District or a National Register Historic District encompassing parts of the Tenth Street Freedman's Town. Only a portion of the original nucleus and subsequent expansion of the Tenth Street Freedman's Town prior to the Second World War is protected by the local historic overlay district. Recollections of longtime residents suggest that some areas included in both the local and national designations, while appropriate to the period of historic significance, were off limits to African Americans during the period of significance and even up until the final years of Jim Crow.

Although the local and national districts were created to recognize the same historic community, the boundaries of the two designations differ slightly from each other. When Dallas adopted the city's twelfth historic district in 1993, the historic overlay was bounded by East Clarendon Drive on the south and southeast, South Fleming Avenue on the southwest, Interstate-35E on the west, East 8th Street on the north from the intersection with I-35E east to the intersection with Denley Drive, thence north along Denley Drive to the north property line of those lots facing south on East 8th Street, thence east along said property line to its intersection with Hutchins Road, thence south along the former Corsicana Interurban right of way to East Clarendon Drive, thence west a short distance along East Clarendon Drive, from which point the boundary jogged south, then west, then north to include the former site of Cuney Street before returning to East Clarendon Drive. The National Register of Historic Places defines the district as roughly bounded by East Clarendon Drive on the south and southeast, South Fleming Avenue on the southwest, Interstate-35E on the west, East 8th Street on the north and the eastern ends of Church Street, East 9th Street and Plum Street on the east, where they dead-end into the old Corsicana Interurban right of way.

In 2026, residents, historians and preservationists worked with the Library of Congress's American Folklife Center to create the Tenth Street Digital Museum.

== History ==
The first African Americans to inhabit what is now known as Oak Cliff were likely between one and three slaves that accompanied George Lawan Leonard and his son, George S.C. Leonard, across the Trinity River from Nacogdoches County into Robertson County in December, 1843. A July, 1844, report by Peters Colony agent Ralph Barksdale confirms the presence of a mere three slaves in the West Trinity zone at the time of his 1844 survey, presumably those owned by George Leonard. By 1846, when William S. Beatty deeded ten acres of his 640-acre survey for a public cemetery west of the Trinity, four area settlers on the west side of the Trinity owned “Negro Property” valued at $4,310, twelve slaves in all. Tax records indicate that David Cameron and William H. Hord owned four slaves each. George Lawan Leonard owned three slaves and Aaron Overton owned a single slave. Of these four, George Leonard was the first to arrive. Cameron and Overton arrived in 1844, followed by Hord in 1845. It stands to reason, then, that some if not all of the three slaves enumerated by Barksdale were those who came with George Leonard near the end of 1843. Conversely, it seems unlikely that Hord, being the last of the four slave holders to arrive, would have brought the first African Americans into the vicinity of William S. Beatty's Robertson County survey.

Beatty stipulated that his burial ground “remain forever open to all.” Slaves were buried in the southern end along what became Tenth Street. Upon Emancipation in 1865, freedmen streamed into Texas cities from across the South. Some sought family members who had been moved west as the Civil War advanced. All sought opportunity. Arch Miller, who came to Texas as William Brown Miller's slave in 1847, was among those who settled on Cedar Creek south of the "Negro Burial Ground."

Sales in the planned city of Oak Cliff began in November, 1887, but not for African Americans. Lying outside of Original Oak Cliff, the land between the burial ground and the creeks was unrestricted. W.J. Betterton bought the four acre tract from William Brown Miller in October, 1887. He extended Tenth Street across the width of the cemetery. A Black urban ownership class in Oak Cliff began with the purchase of lots by Anthony Boswell in January, 1888. Among those who bought lots in Miller's Four Acres before 1890 were trustees of Elizabeth Chapel C.M.E. Church and El Bethel Missionary Baptist Church.

Black ownership was largely confined to the Four Acres until the Panic of 1893. In their haste to divest, investors sold off unimproved lots to anyone with means. Oak Cliff's calamity was Tenth Street's opportunity. Black Tenth Street grew west into Original Oak Cliff, bringing a vibrant mix of businesses and residences that reached a zenith during the Jazz Age. The first “colored” public school on the site of N.W. Harllee came in 1903. Alumni include 1960 Olympic gold medal decathlete Rafer Johnson and guitarist Aaron Thibeaux “T-Bone” Walker, who electrified the blues. On September 8, 1935, jazz saxophonist James Earl Clay was born at his parents' home on Cliff Street, directly behind the Greater El Bethel Missionary Baptist Church. Clay attended N.W. Harllee before going on to graduate from Lincoln High School in South Dallas. In 1937, former slave Mose Hursey told his life story to the Federal Writers Project at his home on Tenth Street. His narrative is part of the Ex-Slave Narrative Collection enshrined in the Rare Book Room at the Library of Congress.

Despite the erasure of significant homes and businesses by the construction of Clarendon Drive between 1942 and 1950 and R.L. Thornton Freeway in the late 1950s, the National Park Service recognized the high level of architectural integrity then present in the community by listing the Tenth Street Historic District on the National Register of Historic Places in 1994. The registration noted that “demolition, rather than new construction or major remodeling, has served as the neighborhood’s main adversary.”

== Transportation ==
=== Light rail ===
DART Blue Line, Red Line

- 8th & Corinth Station

== Notable people ==
- James Earl Clay, "Texas Tenor" jazz saxophonist.
- Rafer Johnson, decathlete and actor.
- Aaron Thibeaux "T-Bone" Walker, blues guitarist.
