= Carl N. Sidle =

African-American photographer

Carl N. Sidle (born 1943) is an American photographer and one of the three founders of the Southwest Black Artists Guild (SBAG). Sidle primarily uses black and white 35mm film to capture images "that convey a positive image of the Black community."

== Life and career ==
Sidle was born in Dallas, Texas on November 14, 1943 and graduated from Booker T. Washington High School. He attended Howard University before returning to Dallas. From 1975 to 1979 he worked in several Dallas area photo labs. In 1979, Sidle began working as a medical photographer for the University of Texas Health Science Center in the biochemistry department.

== Photography ==
Sidle frequently travelled throughout the South with fellow Dallas artist Arthello Beck, and he exhibited his work at the Arthello Beck Gallery in 1974. Sidle's work included many portraits and landscapes. He has also documented the jazz music scene in Dallas for many years. His photographs of jazz musicians such as David "Fathead" Newman, Quamon Fowler, Roy Hargrove and Roger Boykin are in the 2021 book Metro Music. In 1999 the Texas African American Photography Archive had an exhibition titled Carl Sidle: A Retrospective 1979–1996. In 2020 Sidle's work was shown at the George W. Bush Presidential Library and Museum in an exhibition titled Art Past and Present: From a Black Artist's Perspective.

Sidle's photography is included in Deb Willis's Reflections in Black, the first comprehensive history of black photographers in the United States. In addition to a brief overview of Sidle's work in a section of book about street photography and the cultural landscape, one of Sidle's best-known works, Bus Ride (1991), was selected for inclusion in the book.
