= Wheatley Place, Dallas =

- Wheatley Place Historic District
- U.S. National Register of Historic Places
- U.S. Historic district
- Dallas Landmark
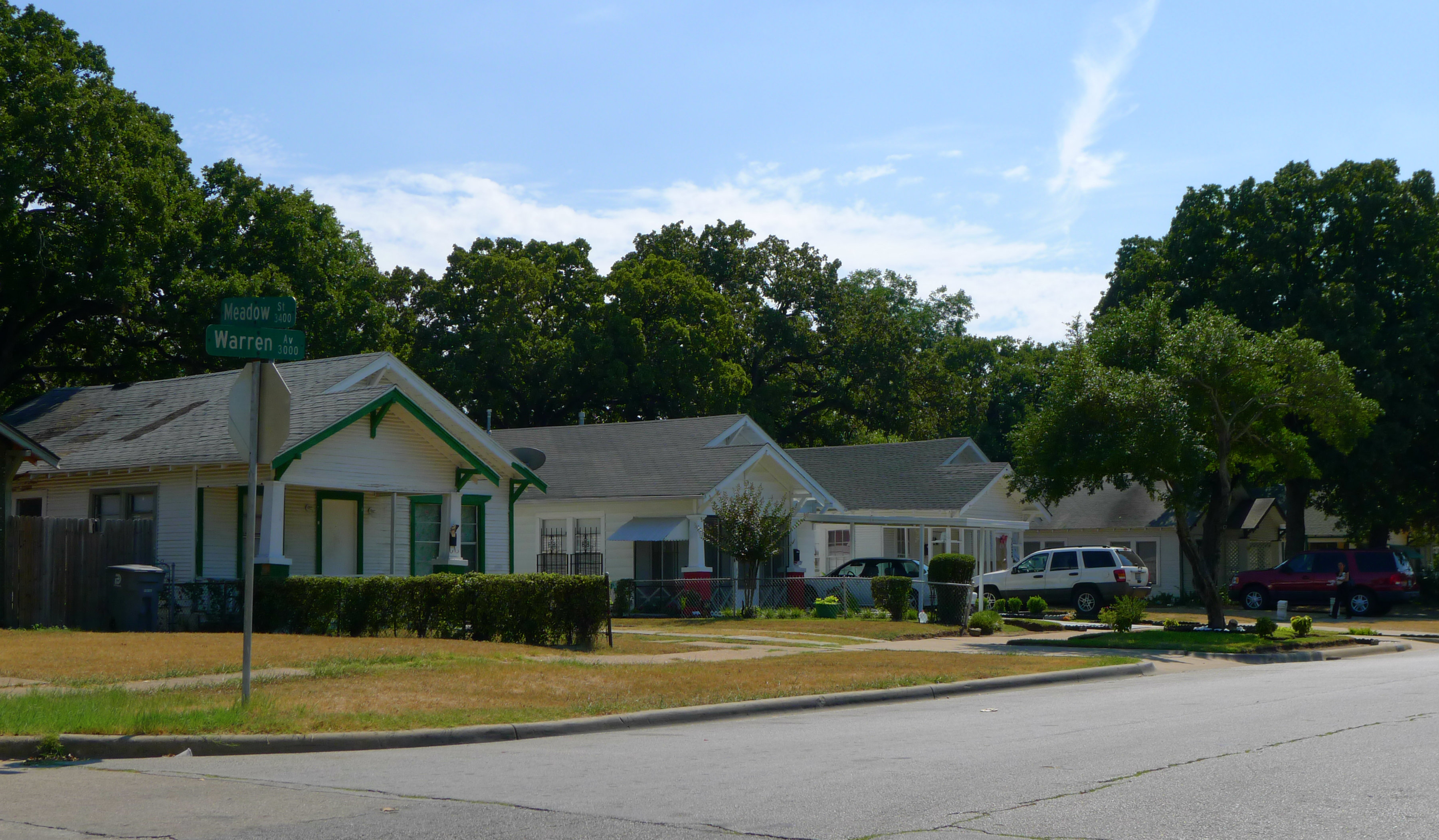
- Houses in the neighborhood in 2014

- Location within Texas Location within the United States
- Location: Bounded by Warren, Atlanta, McDermott, Meadow, Oakland and Dathe, Dallas, Texas
- Coordinates: 32°45′54″N 96°45′43″W
- Area: 98 acres (40 ha)
- Built: 1916
- Architectural style: Bungalow/Craftsman
- MPS: East and South Dallas MPS
- NRHP reference No.: 95000331
- DLMK No.: H/100

Significant dates
- Added to NRHP: March 23, 1995
- Designated DLMK: October 25, 2000

Wheatley Place is a neighborhood in South Dallas, Texas, that is designated as a historic district on the National Register of Historic Places (NRHP) and as a somewhat smaller Dallas Landmark District by the city. Included among the buildings that compose the historic district is the Juanita J. Craft Civil Rights House, a museum that was the former home of Dallas civil rights pioneer, Juanita Craft. The house is a Recorded Texas Historic Landmark and is included within the NRHP district but not the municipal landmark district.

Predominantly constructed as a neighborhood for African-Americans, the area was named for Phillis Wheatley, an African-American poet from the 18th century, who was the first African-American author of a published book of poetry.

The district was listed on the National Register on March 23, 1995, and the Dallas City Council designated Wheatley Place as a historic landmark district on October 25, 2000.

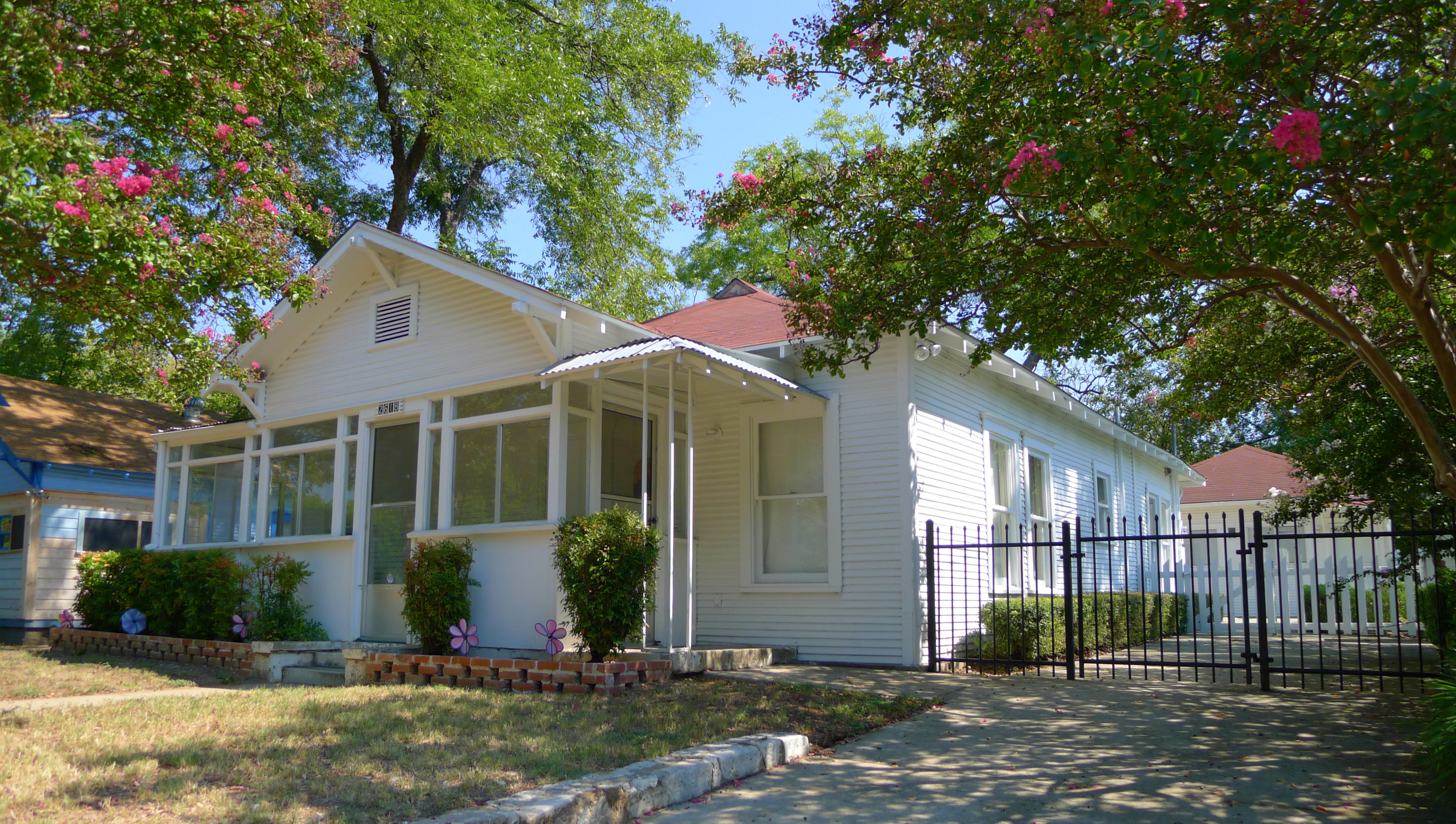
Home of Juanita Craft

== See also ==
- National Register of Historic Places listings in Dallas County, Texas
- Recorded Texas Historic Landmarks in Dallas County
- List of Dallas Landmarks
