= Arthello Beck =

American painter (1941–2004)

- Born: Arthello Beck, Jr. July 17, 1941; Dallas, Texas, U.S.
- Died: November 5, 2004 (aged 63); Tyler, Texas, U.S.
- Education: self-taught
- Known for: painter
- Notable work: Confrontation (1969)

Arthello Beck Jr. (July 17, 1941 – November 5, 2004) was an American artist. He often painted scenes of places he had visited, using a variety of mediums, including oils, watercolors, and charcoal.

Beck was born in Dallas, Texas, and attended Lincoln High School, where he received his only formal art training. Afterwards, he worked for the United States Postal Service, as well as various other jobs before becoming a professional artist.

He is possibly known best for his works from the 1960s dealing with the Civil Rights Movement, although Beck commonly featured other subjects, including children, religion, and human interaction, particularly in the African-American community in the southern regions of the United States.

A longtime resident of Oak Cliff, Beck was a firm believer in grassroots movements, and established the Arthello Beck Gallery, which became a centerpiece of the Dallas area art scene in the 1970s and 80s, and was instrumental to the careers of many black artists.

Beck was a member of the National Conference of Artists and the Southwest Alliance of African American Artists, and was one of the founders of the Southwest Black Artists Guild.

== Honors ==
His paintings and sketches were among those selected for inclusion in a touring exhibition of athlete Grant Hill's collection of African-American artists. Hill, who began collecting art in emulation of his father, Calvin Hill, particularly cited Beck's painting Confrontation (1969) as an influence, saying, "I grew up with this painting, and just as my father is attached to it because it reflects the historic struggle of the black male, so am I."

In 2007, a local campaign was organized to rename the South Dallas Cultural Center in Beck's honor. Although a petition was signed by over 850 residents, the City Council voted unanimously to reject the proposal, choosing instead to give his name to a gallery within the center. The decision met with controversy on both sides, as proponents felt that a gallery within the building was not a sufficiently prominent honor, while others argued that the center's current name brings honor to a section of town that is often maligned and that a majority of the petition's signers lived outside the South Dallas area.
