= Dallas Scottish Rite Temple =

- U.S. National Register of Historic Places
- U.S. Historic district – Contributing property
- Recorded Texas Historic Landmark
- Dallas Landmark
- Dallas Landmark Historic District; Contributing Property
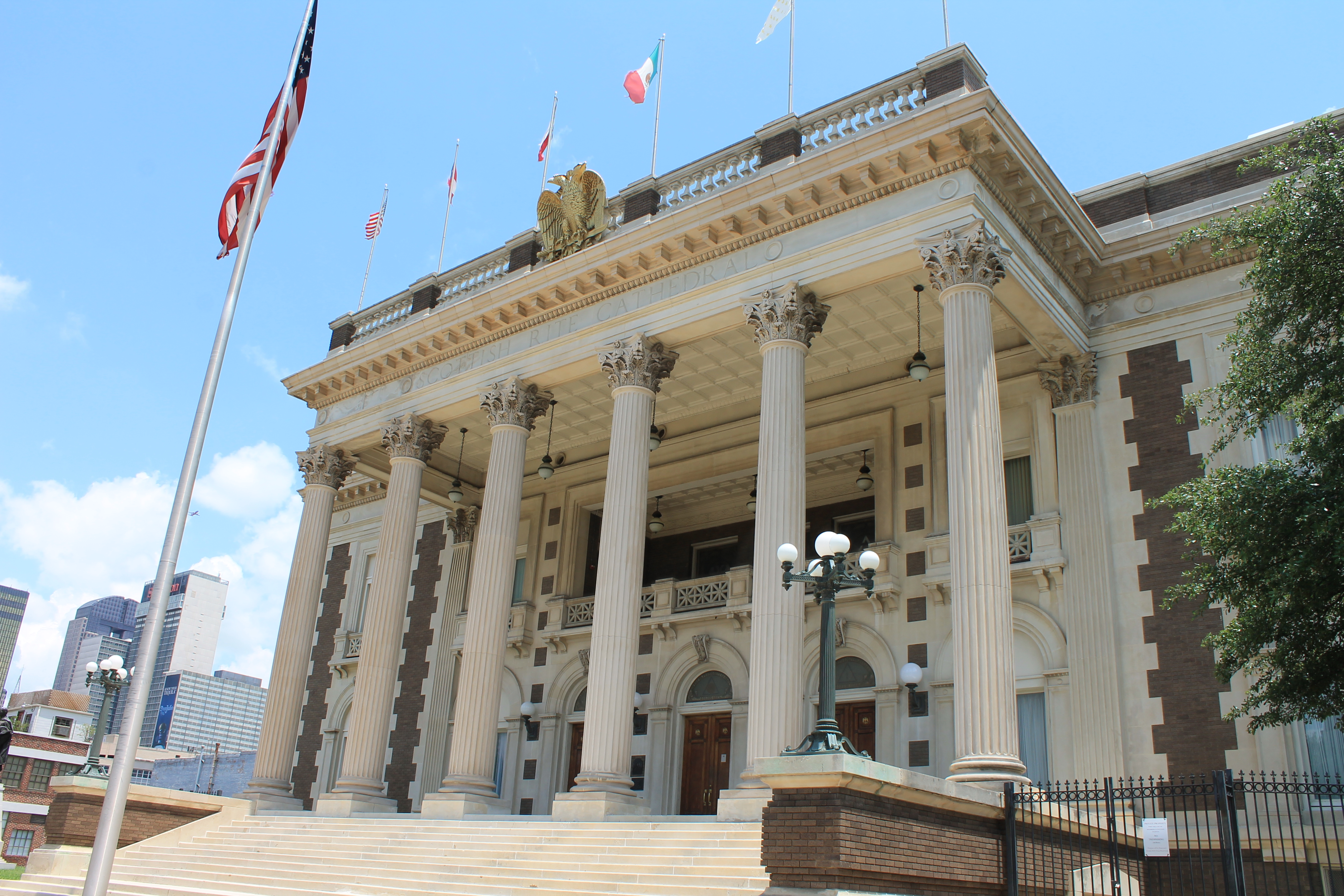
- Scottish Rite Temple in 2012

- Location within Texas Location within the United States
- Location: 500 S. Harwood St., Dallas, Texas
- Coordinates: 32°46′43″N 96°47′31″W
- Area: 3.6 acres (1.5 ha)
- Built: 1909
- Architect: H.M. Greene, B.H. Hubble
- Architectural style: Beaux-Arts
- Website: Scottish Rite of Freemasonry, Valley of Dallas
- Part of: Dallas Downtown Historic District (ID08001299)
- NRHP reference No.: 80004088
- RTHL No.: 6672
- DLMK No.: H/19
- DLMKHD No.: H/48 (Harwood HD)

Significant dates
- Added to NRHP: March 26, 1980
- Designated CP: January 9, 2009
- Designated RTHL: 1978
- Designated DLMK: June 30, 1982
- Designated DLMKHD: February 28, 1990

The Dallas Scottish Rite Temple is a monumental structure in the Farmers Market District of downtown Dallas, Texas. Constructed in 1913 as an official headquarters for use by the Scottish Rite Masons and other local Masonic lodges, it is a fine example of early 20th century Beaux Arts Classical architecture in Texas. The structure, a Dallas Landmark and Recorded Texas Historic Landmark, is listed on the National Register of Historic Places and is a contributing property in the Harwood Street Historic District.

== Photo gallery ==
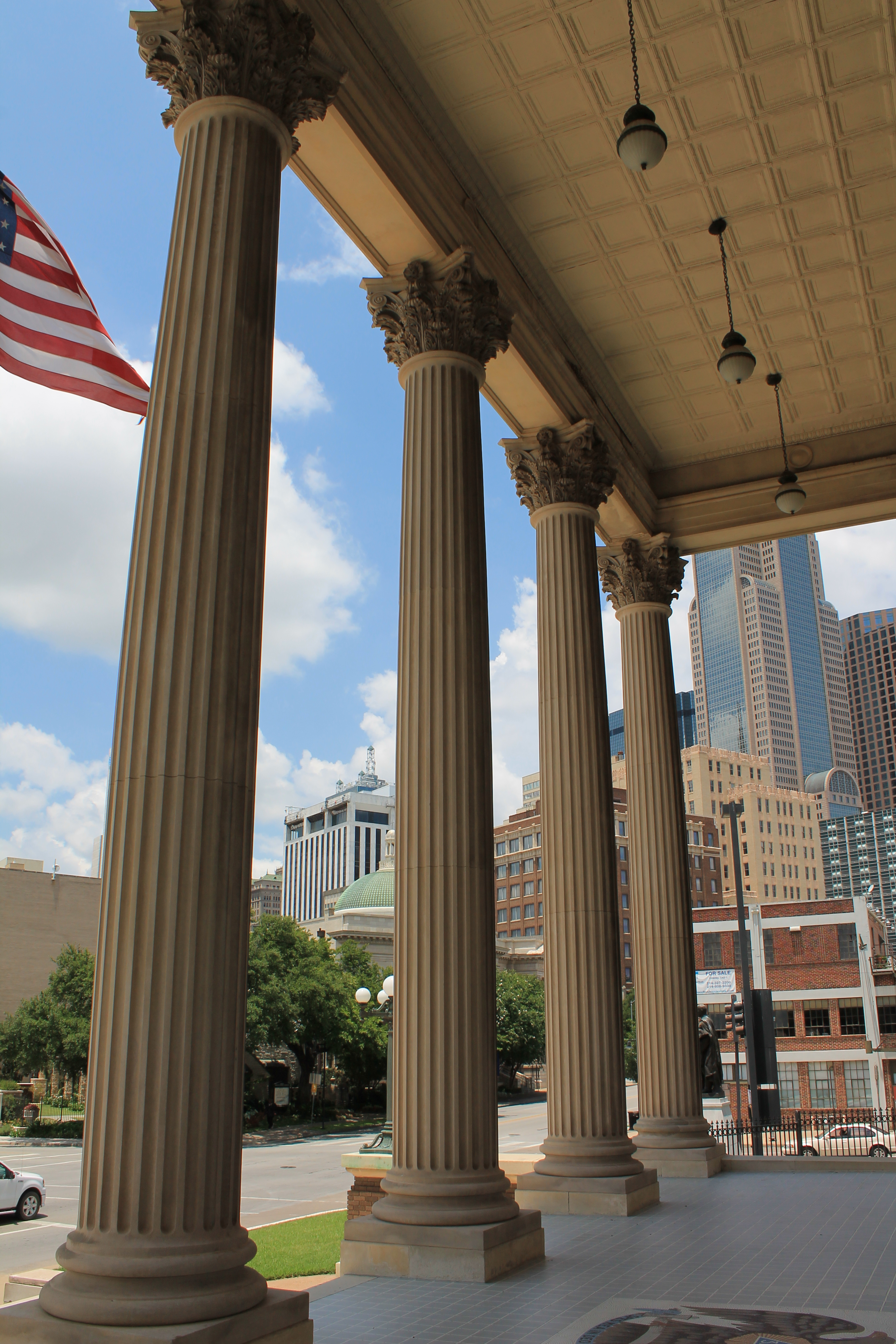

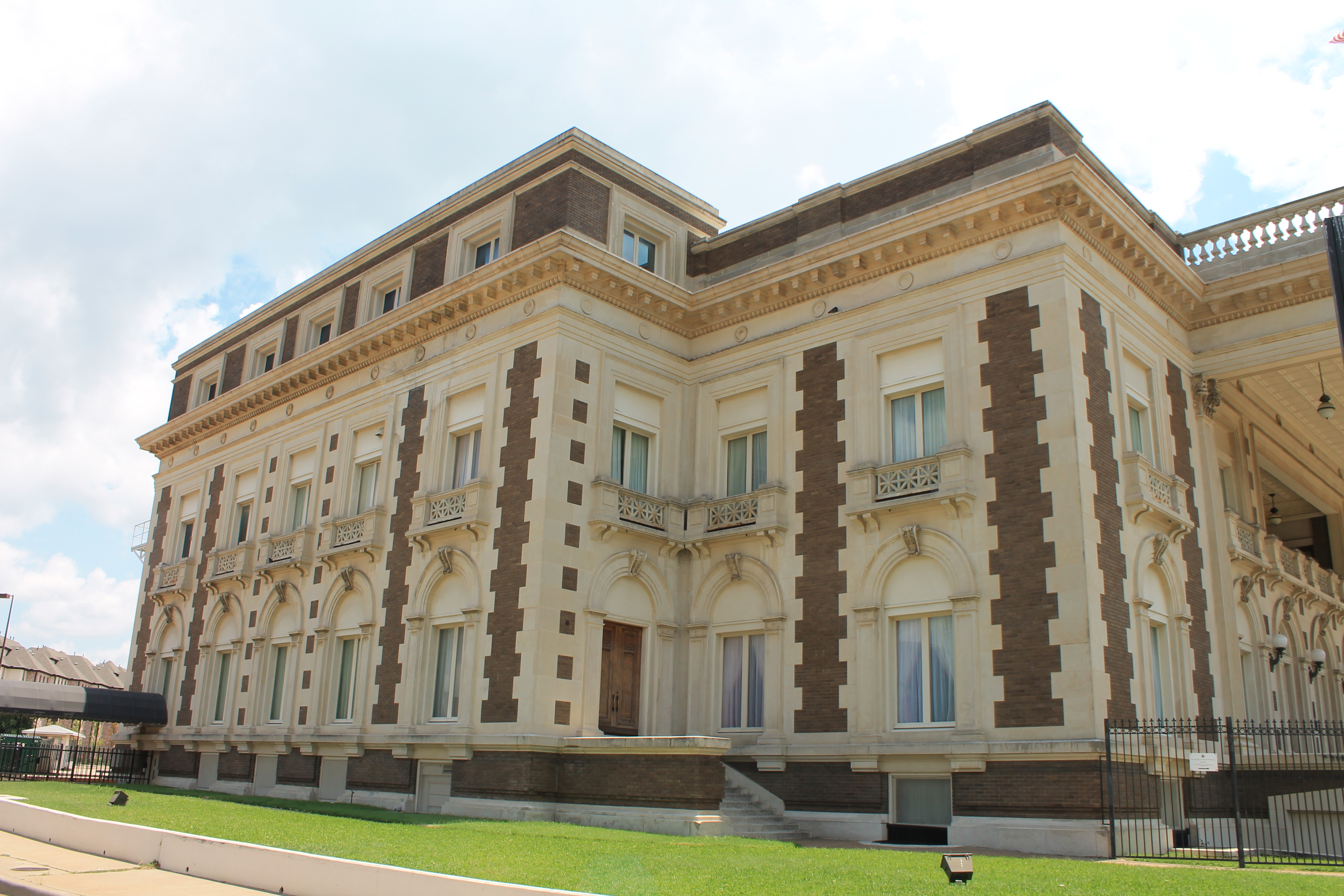

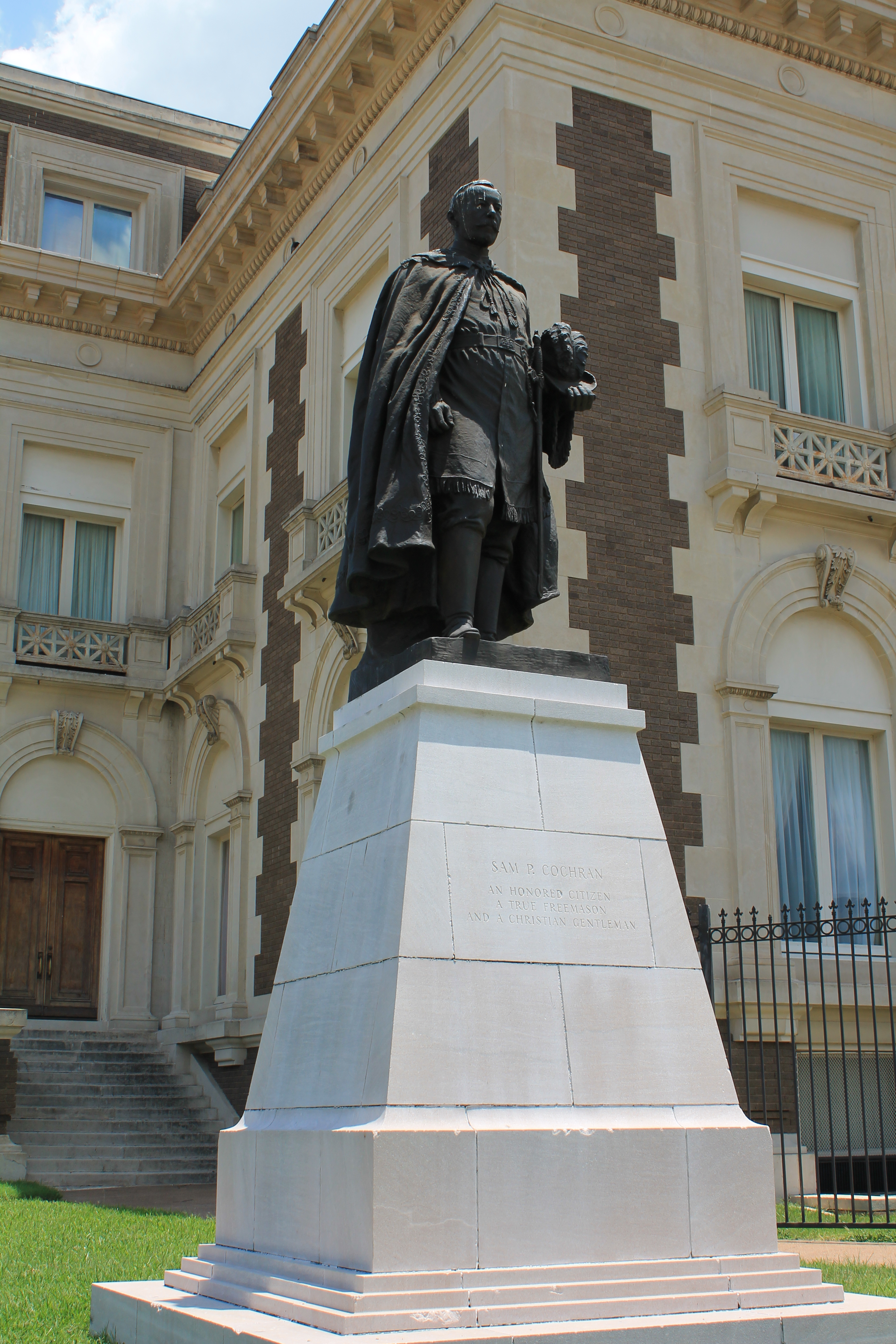

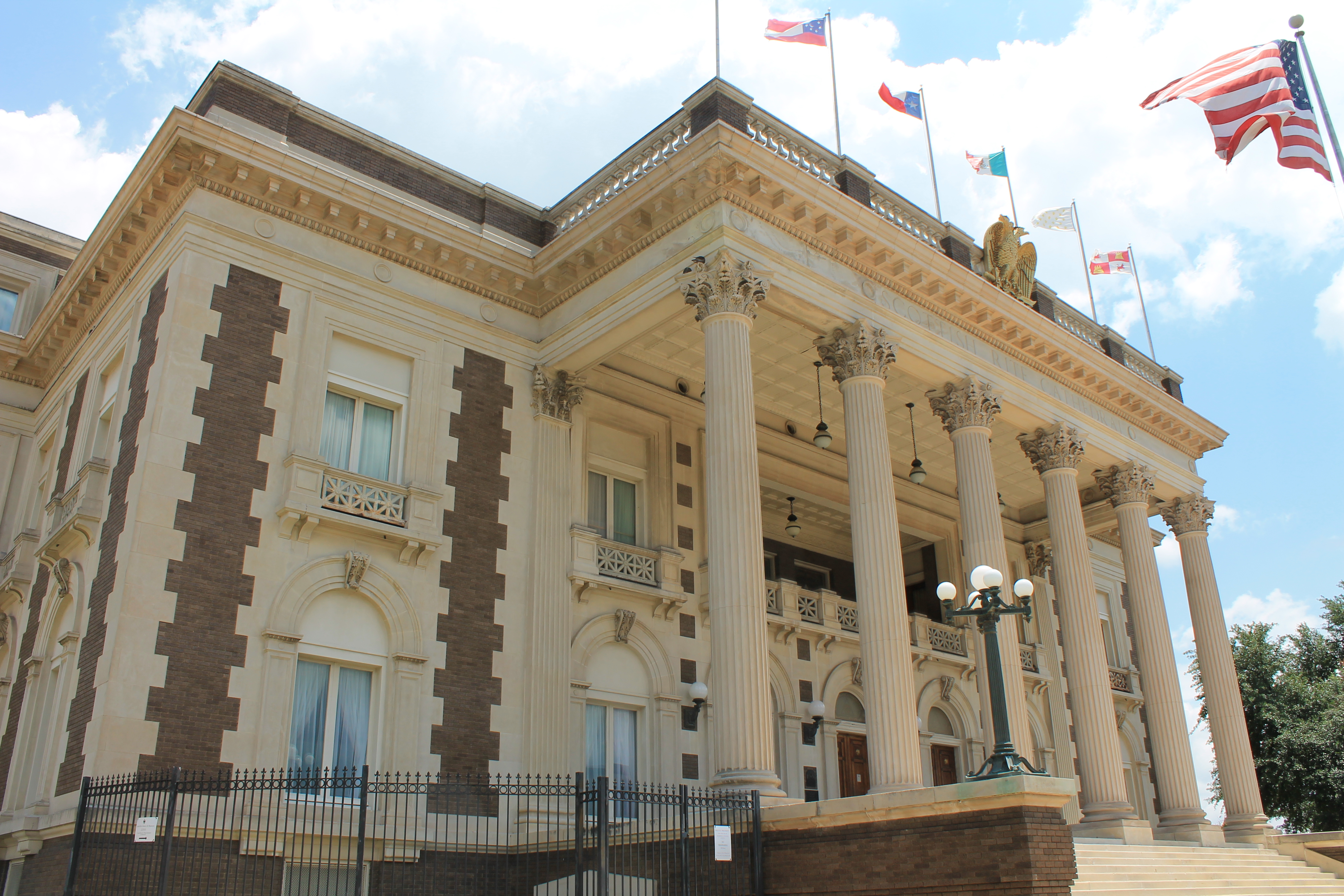

== See also ==
- National Register of Historic Places listings in Dallas County, Texas
- Recorded Texas Historic Landmarks in Dallas County
- List of Dallas Landmarks
