= Santa Fe Terminal Complex =

- Santa Fe Terminal Buildings No. 1 and No. 2
- U.S. National Register of Historic Places
- Dallas Landmark
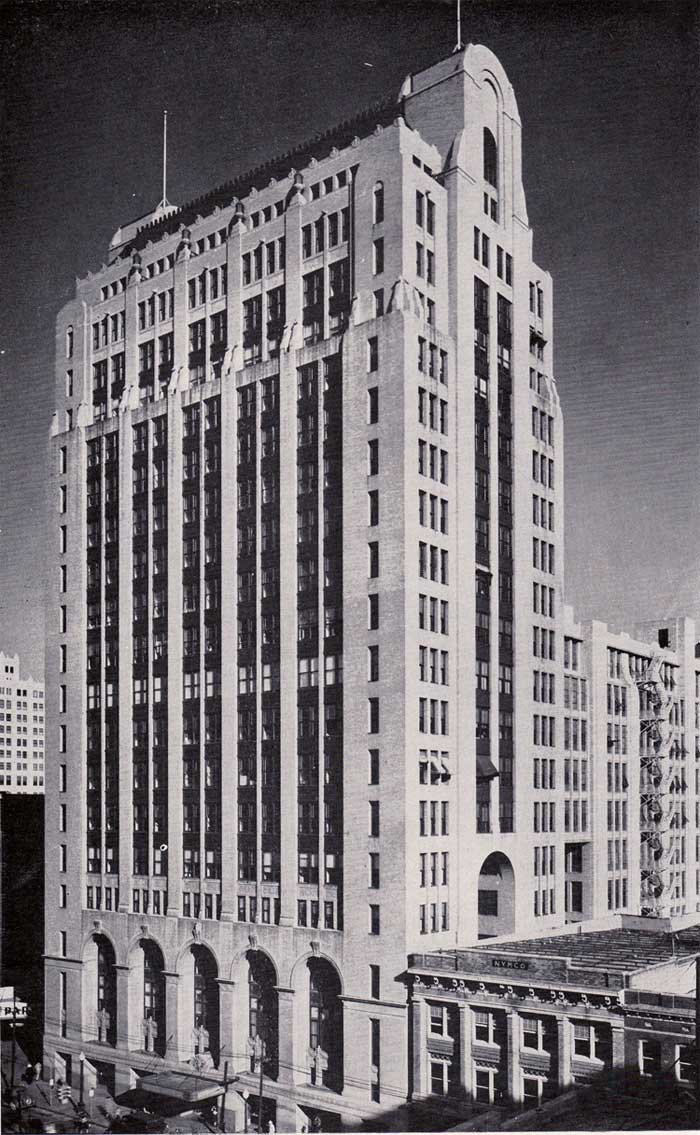
- Historic view of Santa Fe Building No. 1

- Location within Texas Location within the United States
- Location: 1114 Commerce St. and 1118 Jackson St., Dallas, Texas
- Coordinates: 32°47′48″N 96°48′3″W
- Area: 1.8 acres (0.73 ha)
- Built: 1924
- Architect: Lloyd R. Whitson, F. Cowderie Dale
- Architectural style: Chicago, Mission/Spanish Revival, Classical Revival
- NRHP reference No.: 97000478
- DLMK No.: H/43 (Bldg. #1), H/85 (Bldg. #2)

Significant dates
- Added to NRHP: May 23, 1997
- Designated DLMK: February 22, 1989 (Bldg. #1), April 8, 1998 (Bldg. #2)

- Santa Fe Terminal Building No. 4
- U.S. National Register of Historic Places
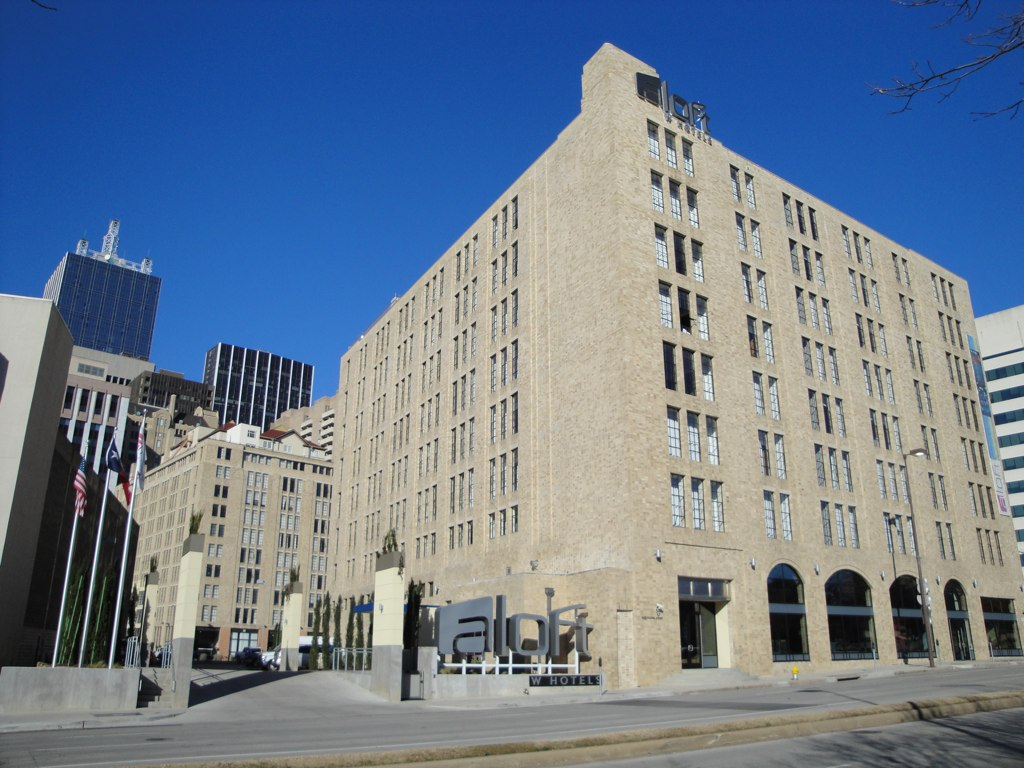
- Santa Fe Building No. 4 in 2010
- Location: 1033 Young St., Dallas, Texas
- Coordinates: 32°46′37″N 96°48′4″W
- Area: 0.8 acres (0.32 ha)
- Built: 1923
- Architect: Lloyd R. Whitson, Frederick (Todd) Cowderie-Dale
- Architectural style: Early Commercial
- NRHP reference No.: 11000344
- Added to NRHP: June 8, 2011

The Santa Fe Terminal Complex is an 18-acre (73,000 m^{2}) complex of historic buildings in the Government District of downtown Dallas, Texas (USA). Constructed in 1924 as the headquarters for the Gulf, Colorado and Santa Fe Railway and the Southwest's largest merchandising center, three of the original four buildings remain today and have been renovated into various uses. Santa Fe Buildings No. 1 and No. 2 were listed in the National Register of Historic Places in 1997, and the buildings are Dallas Landmarks. The Santa Fe Freight Terminal is regarded as one of the chief factors in the development of Dallas commercially.

== History ==
The site chosen for the terminal complex was already owned by the railroad and served by tracks connecting with the East Dallas GC&SF yard. The original Santa Fe station in Dallas was built on the site in 1884 and replaced by the 1896 Richardsonian Romanesque passenger station. The latter was one of six depots belonging to different railroads which became redundant with the completion of Union Station in 1916. The depot was razed and a vast, 100,000 cubic yard excavation done with the equivalent of a box car load of dynamite.

Project architect Lloyd R. Whitson, working with engineers and railroad planners from the AT&SF, planned the complex so that four buildings, in a line running north to south from Commerce to Young Streets, could be served by up to three sets of underground railroad tracks branching from a central subsurface line, which emerged from the underground farther south near the present Dallas Convention Center.

The complex was constructed in 1924-25 as one of the more ambitious Texas building projects of the 1920s and one of the Southwest's largest merchandising centers. All four buildings were linked by a subterranean rail tunnel served by small steam locomotives. Construction of the buildings and the 750-foot-long (230 m) underground freight house was a massive undertaking and work continued around the clock.

Building No. 1, also known as the Santa Fe Office Building, was constructed as the main building at 1114 Commerce Street and opened in late 1924. It contained 20 floors of offices and included a restaurant and drug store, and was the most elaborately decorated building of the complex. The structure featured several setbacks and ornamental arches designed in the Mission Revival style topped by a barrel vaulted roof. The office building provided some of the most desirable office space in Dallas in the 1925-42 period, housing many national corporations and representatives of insurance companies. The rear of the building connected to a 10-story warehouse wing fronting Jackson Street and served as the terminus of the freight depot.

Building No. 2, also known as the Garment Center, followed the same design as Building No. 1's warehouse. This structure was built as 10-story warehouses in light brown brick with large open industrial spaces and concrete columns. The building housed offices and showrooms for manufacturing companies, chemical companies, and building supplies. Near the end of construction, a 2-story structure was added on the roof of the building to serve as the clubhouse for the University Club, a major private men's club. A skybridge was erected to connect the member entrance on the eleventh floor of Santa Fe Building No. 1 with the clubhouse. The penthouse included an auditorium/great hall, library and dining room with bedrooms for resident members and nonresident members' guests on the second level. Trees, shrubs and a putting green surrounded the clubhouse. Plans were made to expand the club to the roofs of Buildings No. 1 and No. 3, but the club only used the penthouse until the late 1930s. Radio station WFAA moved into and converted the former University Club space for a broadcast station in 1940.

Building No. 3 and Building No. 4 were similar in design to the other warehouses, with each being 8 stories in height and connected to the rail tunnel. Building No. 3, also known as the Ingram Freezer Building, was designed for cold storage.

=== Rail operations ===
Thirty-five to forty rail cars entered the tunnel each day, pulled by a "hot water bottle" locomotive. It was specially designed to prevent smoke in the main line and its six spurs in the tunnels by being charged with steam, which would last from four to five hours from a central, high pressure boiler under the office building. A 1924 Santa Fe Magazine article called the engine a "unique feature in locomotive construction, only one other of its type being in existence." They remained in service until about 1950, when diesel locomotives assumed the duty. Rail cars carried goods into the buildings and then the 21 freight elevators lifted merchandise to upper-level showrooms and first-floor trucking platforms.

=== Change of ownership ===
In 1942 the United States Government acquired Building No. 1 by eminent domain, converting portions of the building to serve as headquarters for the U.S. Army 8th Service Command as well as an enlistment center. Thousands of draftees, after reporting to the enlistment center in Building No. 1, proceeded to platforms beneath the buildings where they boarded trains bound for training centers. Informal sources suggest the building has among the strongest associations with the war effort of any building in North Texas.

After the government's acquisition of the complex, the warehouse buildings passed into various ownership. Construction of the nearby Dallas Convention Center severed the link to the main rail lines, and over time the warehouses became vacant. Santa Fe Building No. 3 was demolished in 1988 and replaced with a large parking lot. Santa Fe Buildings No. 1 and No. 2 were listed in the National Register of Historic Places in 1997 and renovated over the years, although the isolated No. 4 building remained abandoned for many years.

== Current use ==
Santa Fe Building No. 1 still houses offices for the federal government, with additional space in the adjacent Earle Cabell Federal Building and Courthouse. Santa Fe Building No. 2 was redeveloped into SoCo Urban lofts. Santa Fe Building No. 4, at the complex's southernmost point, reopened in 2009 as the downtown Dallas Aloft Hotel. Remnants of the tunnels still remain in the buildings today.

== Gallery ==
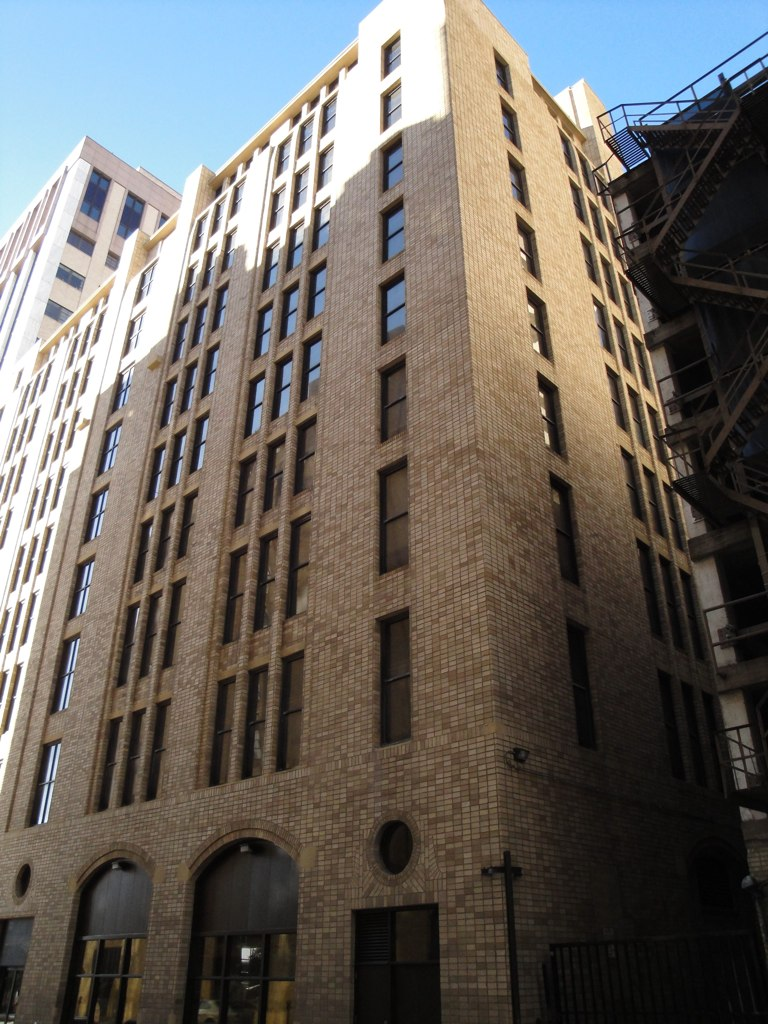
Rear warehouse extension of Santa Fe Building No. 1

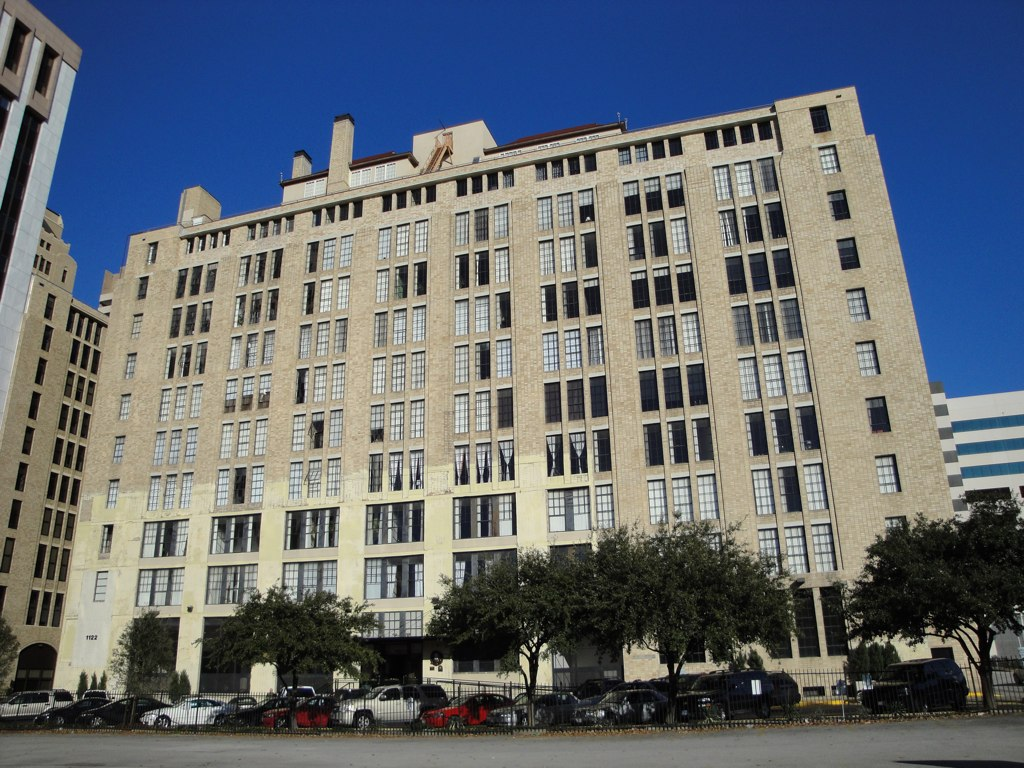
SoCo Lofts in Building No. 2

== See also ==
- National Register of Historic Places listings in Dallas County, Texas
- List of Dallas Landmarks
