= List of Dallas Landmarks =

Dallas Landmark is a designation by the government of Dallas and the Dallas Landmark Commission for historic buildings and districts in Dallas, Texas. Listed sites are selected after meeting a combination of criteria, including historical, economic, architectural, artistic, cultural, and social values. Once a structure or district is designated a landmark, it is protected by an ordinance with specific preservation criteria, which require that any alterations beyond routine maintenance, up to and including demolition, must have their permits reviewed by the Landmark Commission.

== Criteria ==
Buildings eligible for Dallas Landmark structure designation are those that possess any of these merits:

1. Character
2. Location of a significant historical event
3. Identification with a historically significant person or persons
4. Cultural, economic, social, or historical heritage
5. Architectural style
6. Architect or master builder
7. Architectural innovation
8. Archaeological significance, or value as an aspect of community sentiment or pride

Dallas Landmark districts are defined areas with a significant concentration of structures unified by their architectural style or related historical events.

Many Dallas Landmark structures are eligible or have been recognized as a contributing property on the National Register of Historic Places or Recorded Texas Historic Landmark list. Many of the Dallas Landmark districts fall within other local or national historic districts, as well.

== Landmark Commission ==
The Dallas mayor and city council appoint an 18-member Landmark Commission consisting of one representative for each district and three alternates for a two-year unpaid term beginning on September 1 of each odd-numbered year. All commissioners have knowledge and experience in the fields of history, art, architecture, or historic preservation. The Landmark Commission and City Plan Commission make recommendations for City of Dallas landmarks that are forwarded to the Dallas City Council.

The Designation Committee is an advisory committee appointed by the Landmark Commission made up of Landmark Commissioners and citizens. The combination of historians, architects, archeologists, and preservation consultants is responsible for reviewing applications for new landmarks and historic districts. The committee reviews applications for new city landmarks and forwards the recommendations to the Landmark Commission.

== List of landmarks ==
For consistency, the lists below use the names from the Dallas Landmark website.

=== Structures ===
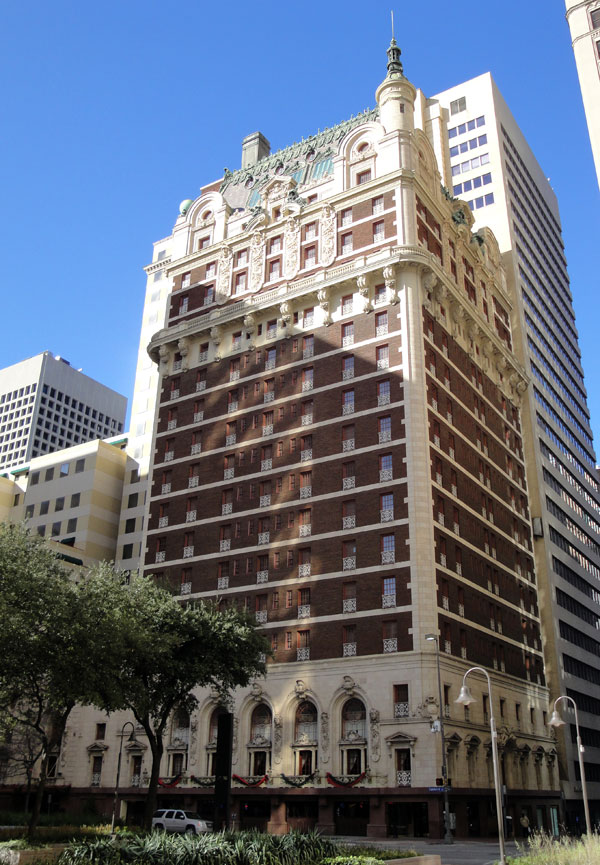
Adolphus Hotel

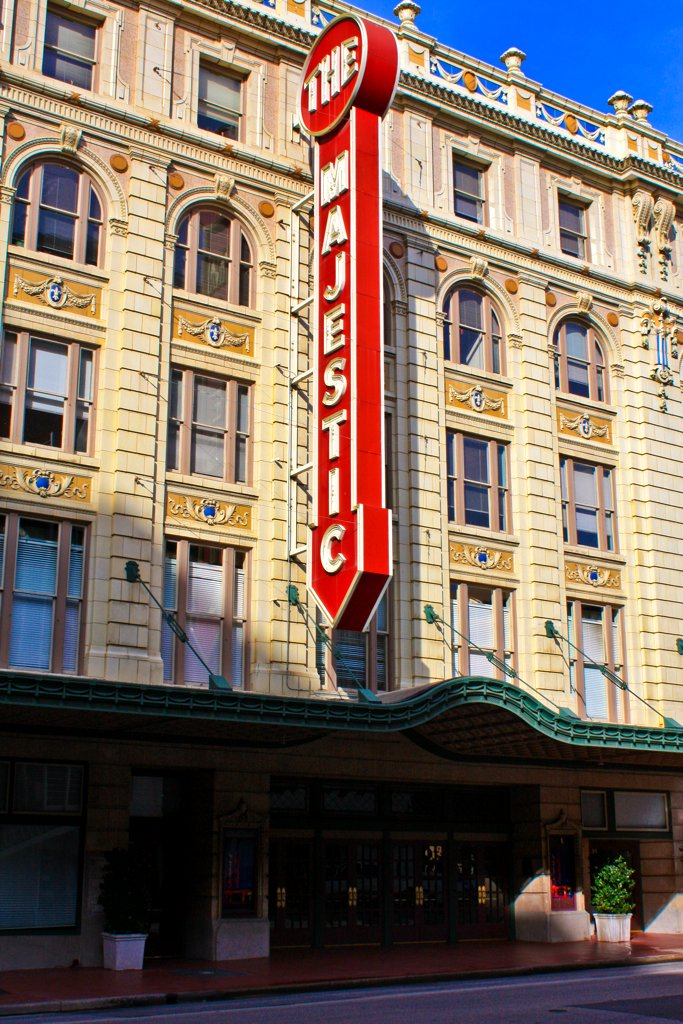
The Majestic Theatre is the sole survivor of Theater Row.

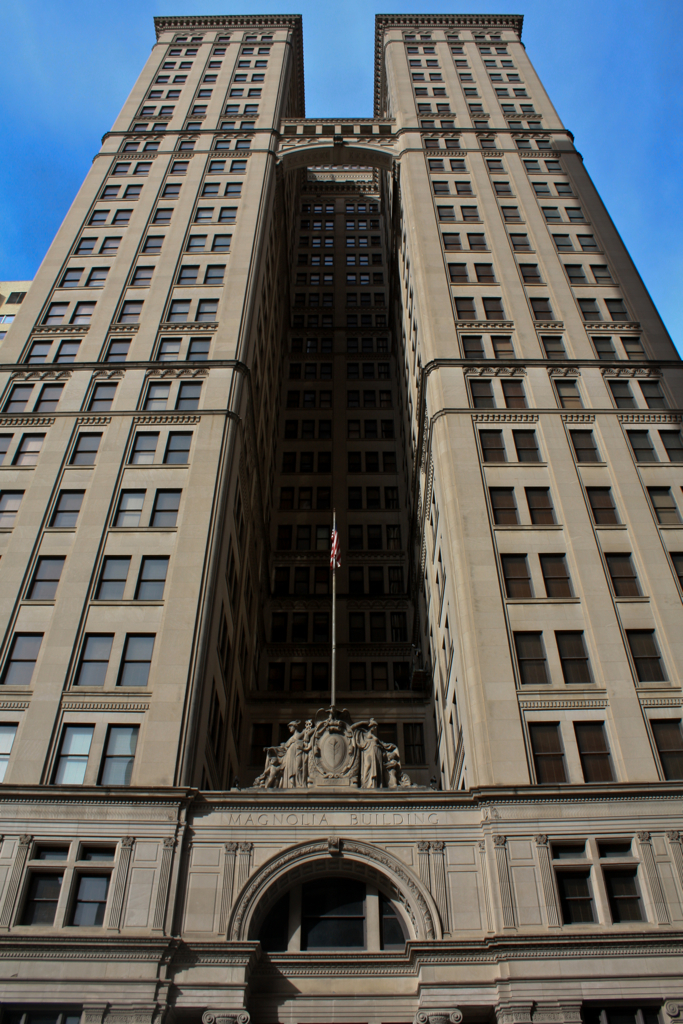
Magnolia Building

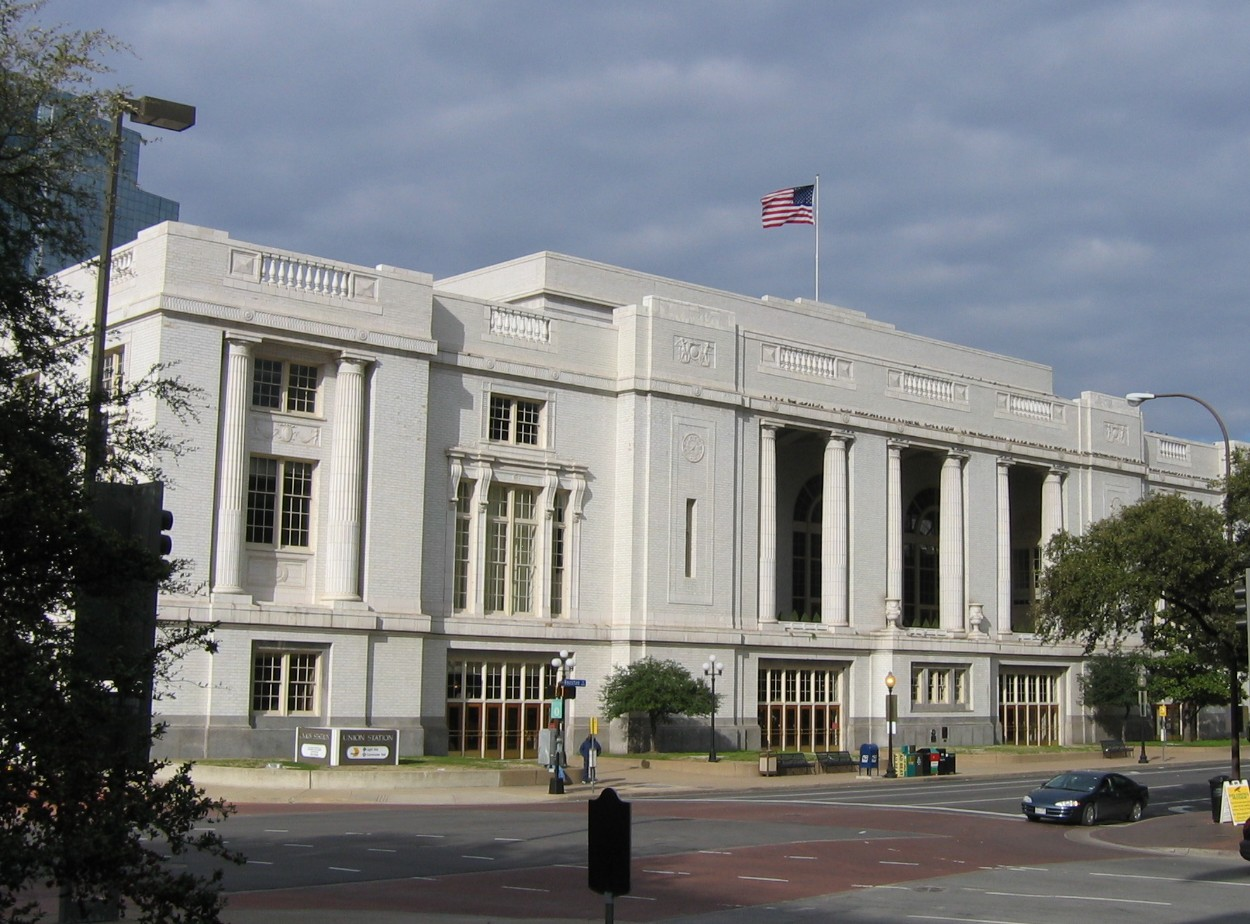
Union Station

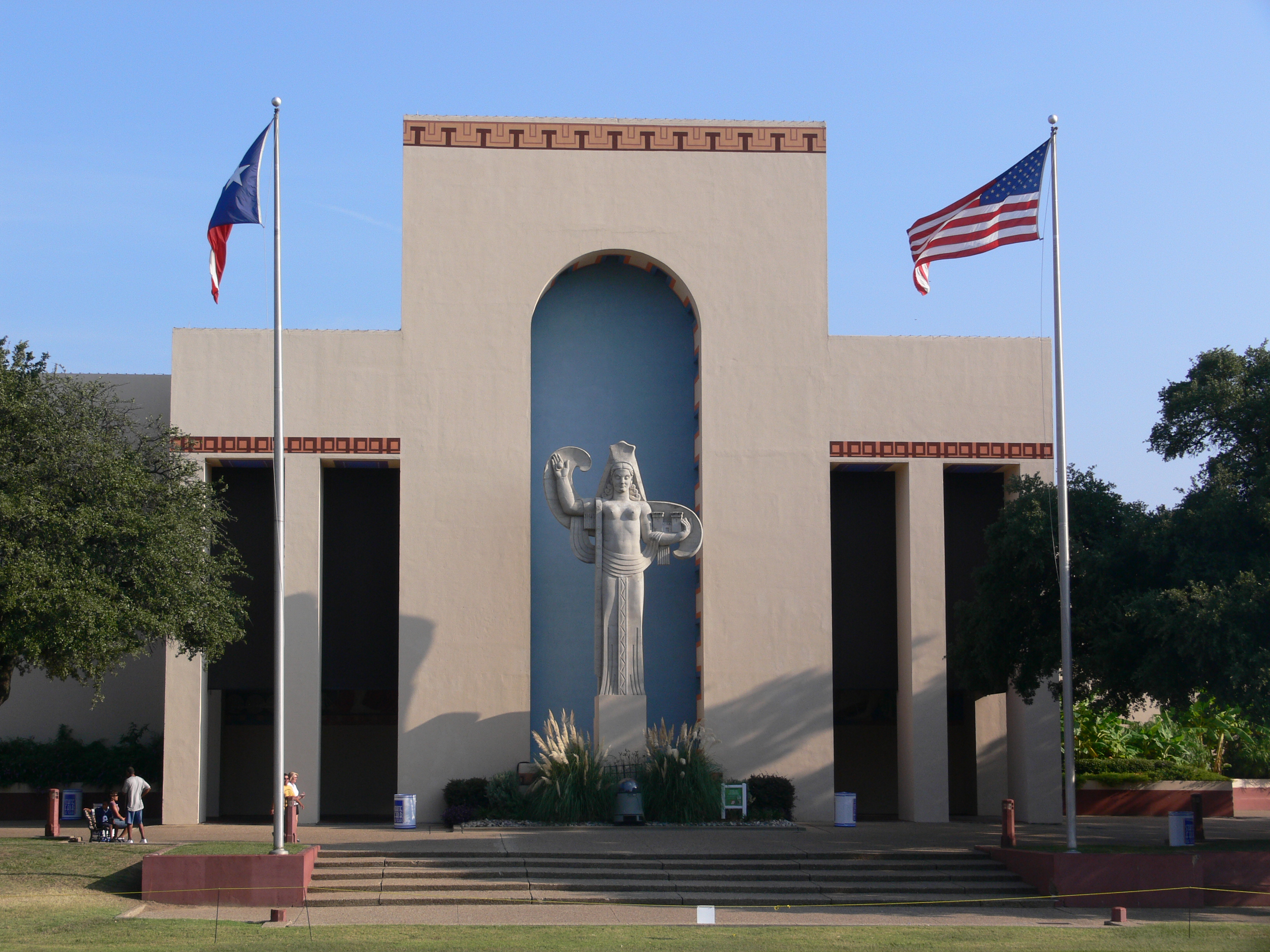
Fair Park contains the largest collection of art deco exposition architecture.

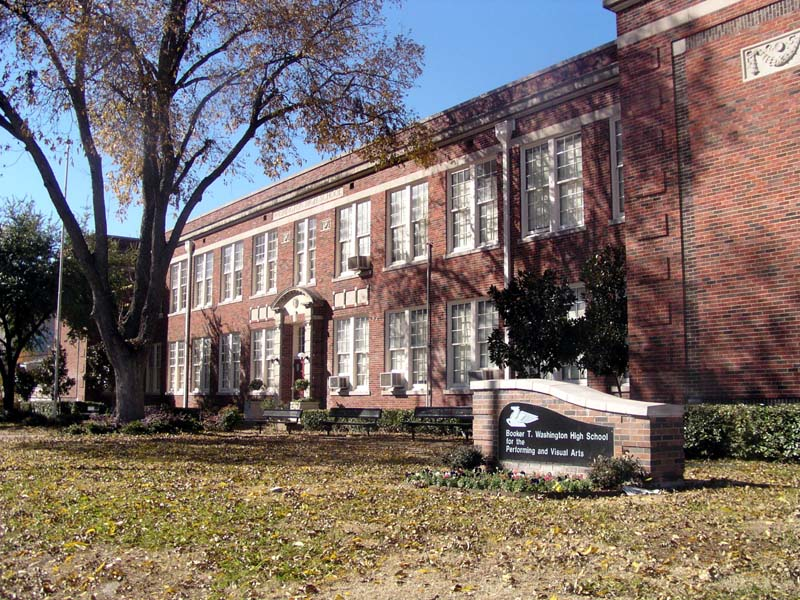
Booker T. Washington High School for the Performing and Visual Arts

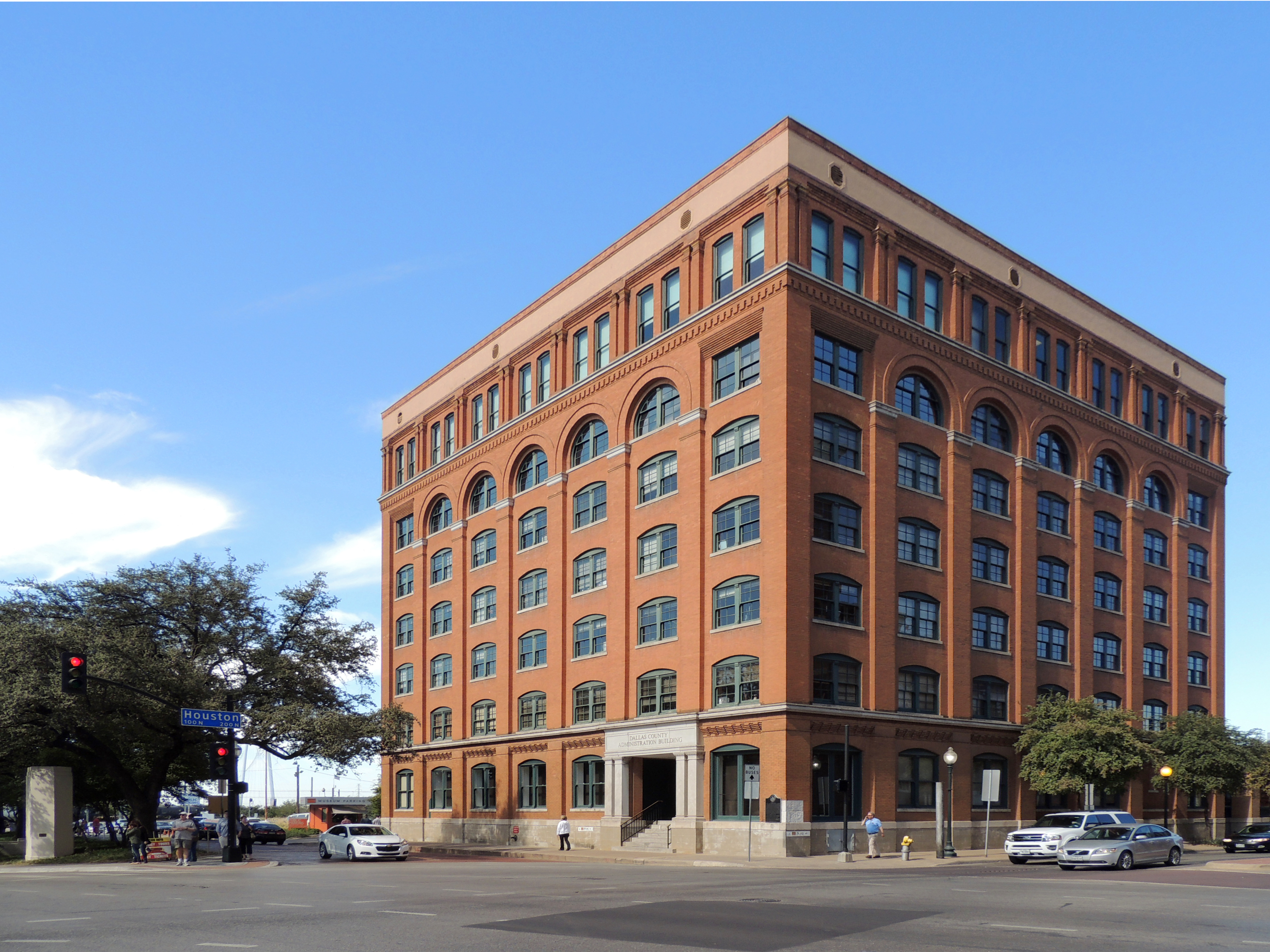
The former Texas School Book Depository building is located in the West End Historic District.

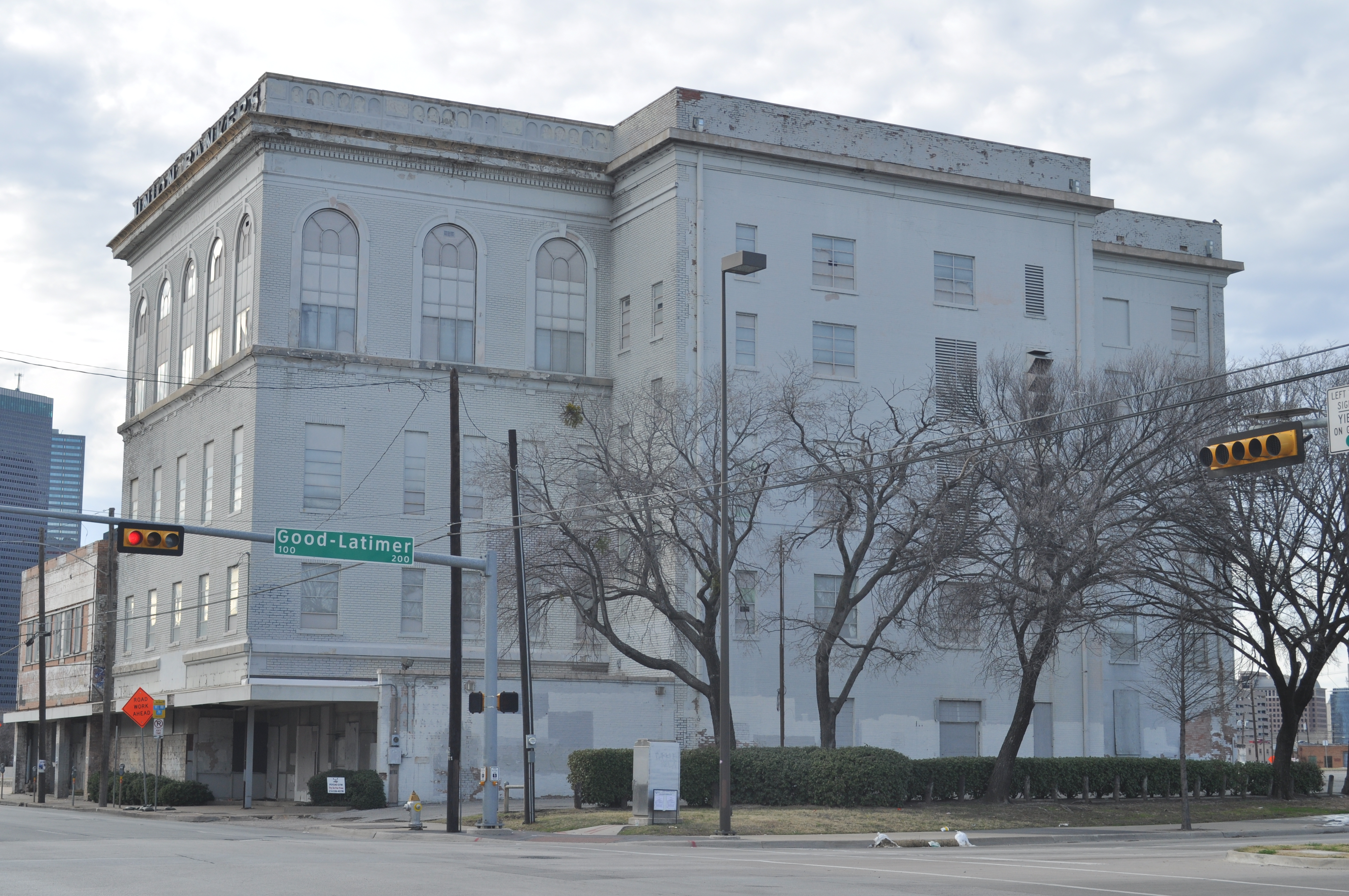
Knights of Pythias Temple (Union Bankers Building), Deep Ellum

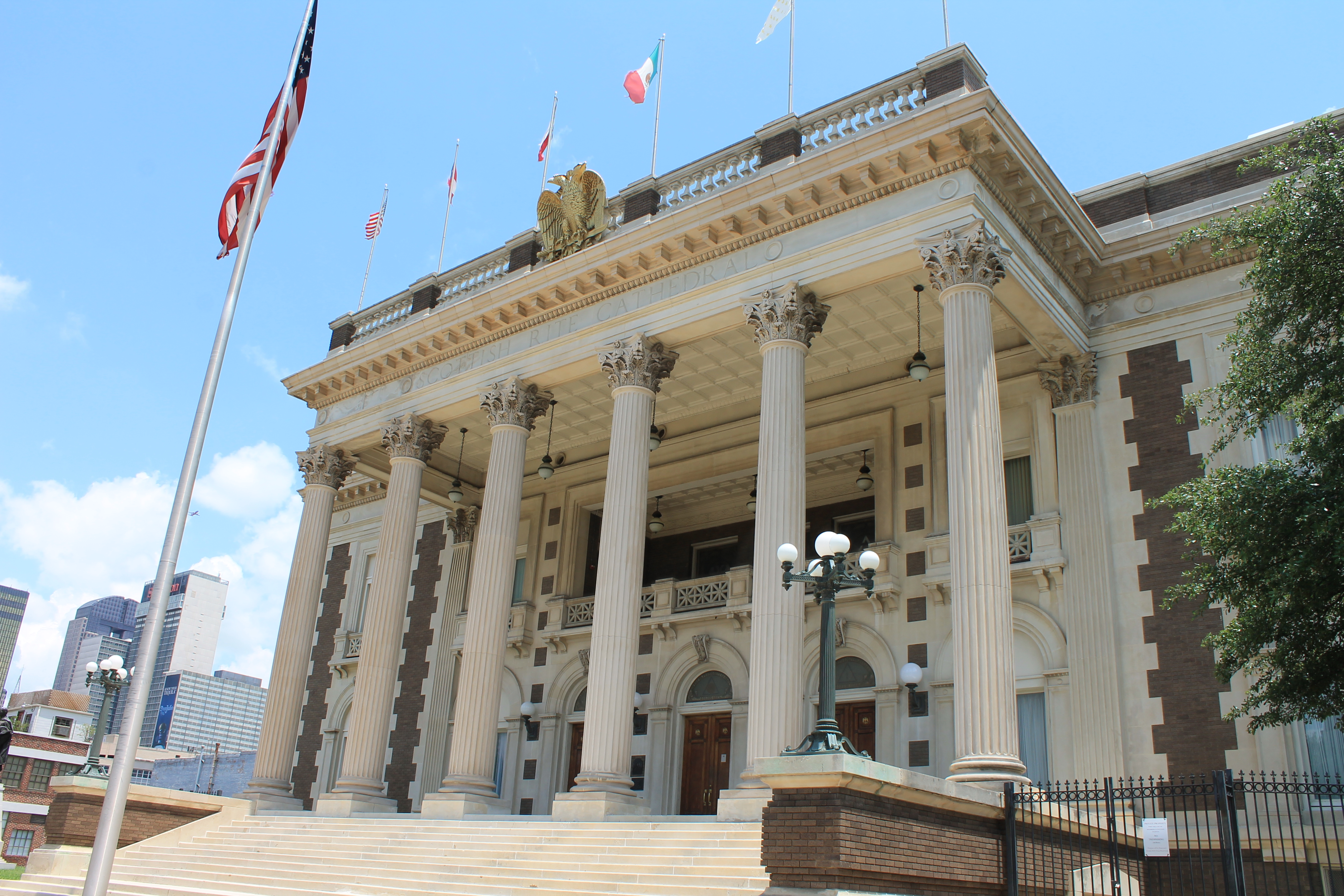
Scottish Rite Cathedral

Name	Image	Designated	Location	NRHP Date	RTHL Date	Current Use
2220 Canton Lofts		November 22, 1994	2220 Canton Street			residential
Adam Hat		May 14, 1997	2700 Canton Street			residential
Adolphus Hotel		September 30, 1987	1315 Commerce Street	July 14, 1983	1981	hotel
Albert A. Anderson House		May 27, 1998	300 Centre Street			
Allen House		April 9, 2001	2603 Fairmount Street			
Ambassador Hotel		June 28, 1982	1312 S. Ervay Street		1965	destroyed by fire
American Beauty Mill		November 25, 1996	2400 S. Ervay Street			residential
B. Parks Bros. Storage		February 11, 1991	2639 Elm Street			
Betterton House		June 13, 1995	705 Marsalis			
Bishop Arts Building		June 7, 1999	408 W. Eighth Street			commercial
Booker T. Washington School		April 24, 2006	2501 Flora Street			education
Boyd Hotel		August 29, 1996	2934 Elm Street			commercial
Busch – Kirby Building and Annex		September 28, 1987	1509 Main Street, 1511 Main Street	July 4, 1980	1988	residential
Cedar Crest House		August 8, 1984	2223 West Jefferson Boulevard			
Cedar Springs Fire Station		March 22, 1979	3828 Cedar Springs Road			municipal
City Hotel		January 8, 1999	2528 Elm Street			commercial
Columbus Langeley Grocery		June 13, 1989	1501-05 Beaumont Street			commercial
Cox Farmhouse (Dallas, Texas)		January 20, 1993	11210 Cox Lane			residential
Crown Hill Mausoleum		March 21, 1990	9700 Webb Chapel Road			municipal
Cumberland Hill School		November 29, 1988	1901 North Akard Street			commercial
Dallas High School/Crozier Tech		December 13, 2000	2214 Bryan Street	February 20, 1996		vacant
Dallas Power and Light Building		January 5, 1999	1506 Commerce Street			residential
Dallas Tent and Awning Building		March 21, 1995	2401 Commerce Street			residential
Davis Building		May 27, 1998	1309 Main Street	January 18, 2006		residential
Davy Crockett School		October 25, 1993	4001 N. Carroll Avenue			residential
DeGolyer House and Gardens		March 23, 1988	8525 Garland Road	December 28, 1978		cultural
East Dallas Christian Church		December 15, 1993	629 N. Peak Street			
East DP&L Substation			3700 Willow Street			
Elizabeth Chapel			1026 East 10th Street			demolished
F.A. Brown Farmstead		July 13, 1987	4611 Kelton Avenue			
Fannin Elementary School		August 13, 1996	4800 Ross Avenue			education
Federal Reserve Bank		October 6, 1977	400 S. Akard Street			commercial
Fire Station #16		August 15, 1988	5501 Columbia Avenue	April 17, 1997		municipal
First Presbyterian Church		October 21, 1981	401 South Harwood Street			
Freedman's Cemetery		February 6, 1992	Central Expressway at Lemmon			cultural
Good Luck Gas Station		June 17, 1992	903 Cadiz Street			vacant
Grace Methodist Church		December 11, 1979	4105 Junius Street			
Harlan Building		August 16, 1988	2018 Cadiz Street	February 26, 2004		
Higginbothan-Bailey Building		July 27, 1984	900 Jackson Street		1984	commercial
Interstate Forwarding Building		September 25, 1991	3200 Main Street			
James Madison High School		November 3, 1993	3000 Martin Luther King Boulevard			education
King Mansion		January 9, 2004	3417 Gillespie Street			hotel
Kings Court Apartments		June 12, 1992	1234 Kings Highway			
Knights of Pythias Temple		October 23, 1989	2551 Elm Street			vacant
Kovandovitch House		July 17, 1996	523 Eads Avenue			
La France Building		September 9, 1997	3600 Commerce Street			
Lincoln High School		September 13, 1995	5000 Oakland Avenue			education
Luna Tortilla Factory		April 6, 2001	1615 McKinney Avenue			commercial
Magnolia Building		December 10, 1997	108 S. Akard Street	January 30, 1978	1978	hotel
Majestic Theatre		April 10, 1992	1923 Elm Street	November 14, 1977	1983	cultural
Mallory Drug Store		September 8, 1998	900 W. Jefferson Boulevard			
Melrose Hotel		March 16, 1983	3015 Oak Lawn Avenue			hotel
Mitchell Building		April 28, 1997	3800 Commerce Street	March 4, 1991		residential
Oak Cliff Methodist Church		December 7, 2004	541-49 E. Jefferson Boulevard		1999	
Oak Lawn Methodist Church		August 15, 1984	3014 Oak Lawn Avenue	March 16, 1988		
Old City Hall		March 15, 1982	106 S. Harwood Street		1978	municipal
Old Parkland Hospital		January 7, 1987	3819 Maple Avenue			commercial
Old Tige Fire Station		August 2, 1976	3801 Parry Avenue			cultural
Palace Blacksmith Shop		March 9, 2001	2814 Main Street			commercial
Phyllis Wheatley School		October 25, 1993	2908 Metropolitan Street			
Plaza Hotel		February 18, 1986	1933 Main Street	December 5, 1985	1988	hotel
Ross Avenue Baptist Church			5201 Ross Avenue		1999	demolished
Santa Fe Warehouse #1		February 17, 1989	1114 Commerce Street	May 23, 1997		government
Santa Fe Warehouse #2		March 18, 1998	1122 Jackson	May 23, 1997		residential
Scottish Rite Cathedral		June 28, 1982	500 S. Harwood Street	March 26, 1980	1978	
Shingle Style House		April 29, 1981	3506 Cedar Springs Road	May 23, 1980	1981	commercial
Sons of Hermann		February 2, 1987	3414 Elm Street			
Southern Pine House		January 20, 1992	3003 Kinmore			
Spence Middle School		July 25, 1996	4001 Capital Avenue			education
St. Ann's School		June 18, 1999	2514 Harry Hines Boulevard			commercial
St. Paul United Methodist Church		March 15, 1982	1816 Routh Street	December 27, 2016		
Texas Farm and Ranch Building		March 21, 1995	3306 Main Street	December 9, 1999		
Texas Theatre		October 4, 2001	231 W. Jefferson Boulevard	April 1, 2003	2013	cultural
Trinity Methodist Church			2120 McKinney Avenue			demolished
Turtle Creek Pump Station		June 24, 1981	3630 Harry Hines Boulevard	February 9, 2001	1983	cultural
United States Post Office and Courthouse		April 5, 1983	400 N. Ervay Street			residential
Union Station		January 17, 1977	400 S. Houston Street	May 29, 1975	1979	commercial
Wales Apartments		November 22, 1994	4515 Live Oak Street			
Western Union Building		June 13, 1995	2028–2034 Main Street			commercial
White Rock Bath House		September 3, 1966	521 Lawther Drive			cultural
White Rock Pump Station		June 26, 2007	2900 White Rock Road		1989	municipal
Woodrow Wilson High School		January 20, 1992	100 S. Glasgow		1989	education
Zion Hill Missionary Baptist Church		June 16, 2004	919 Morrell Avenue		2004	organization

=== Districts ===
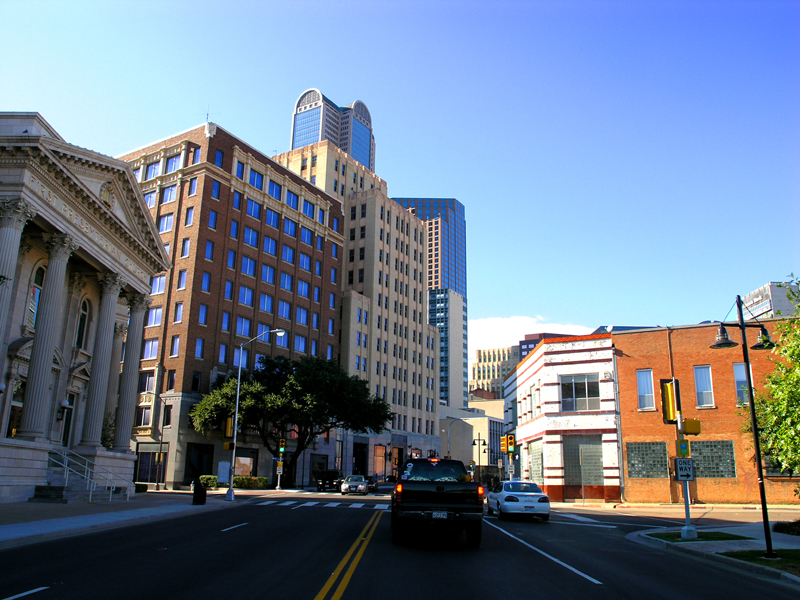
Harwood Street Historic District

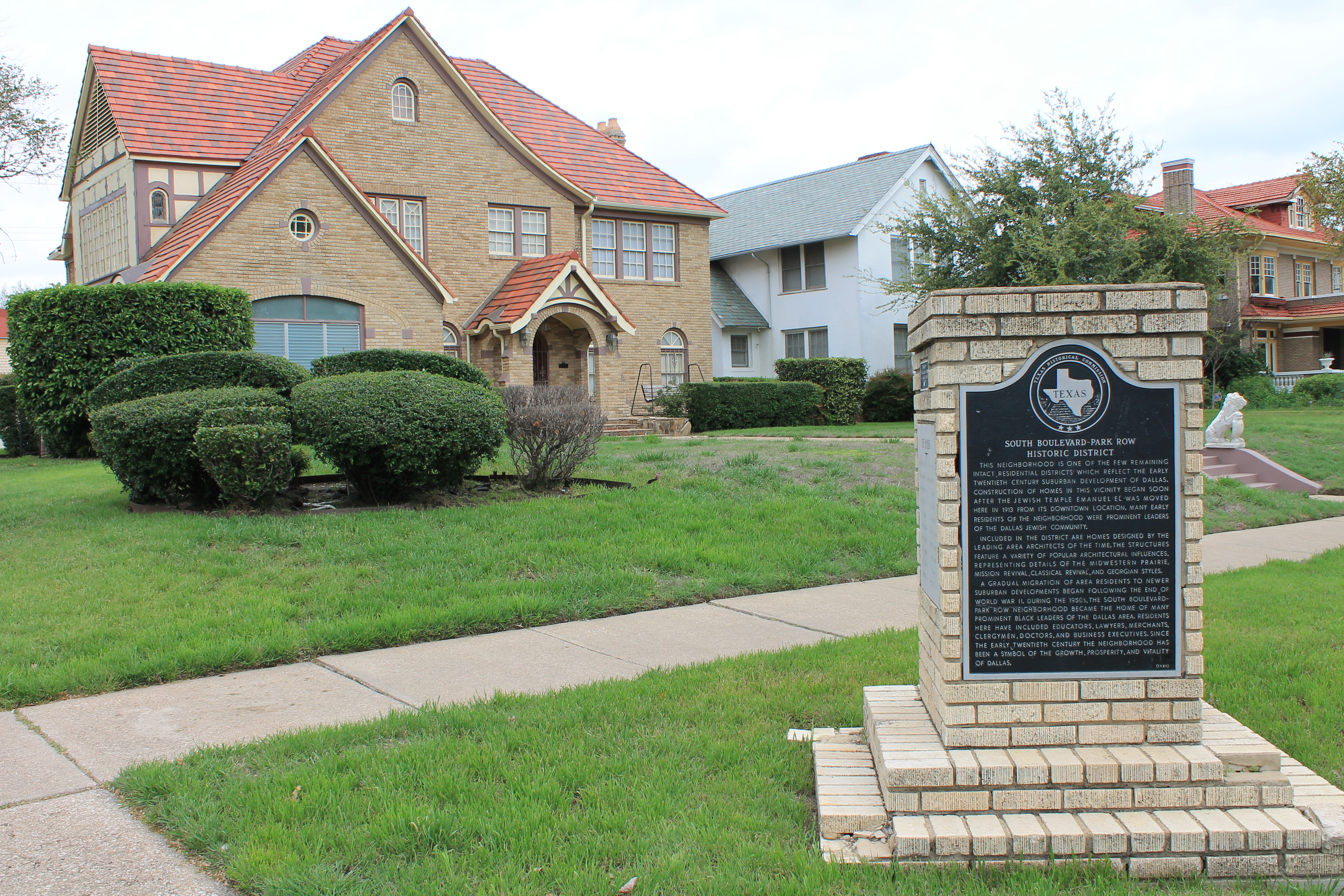
South Boulevard-Park Row Historic District

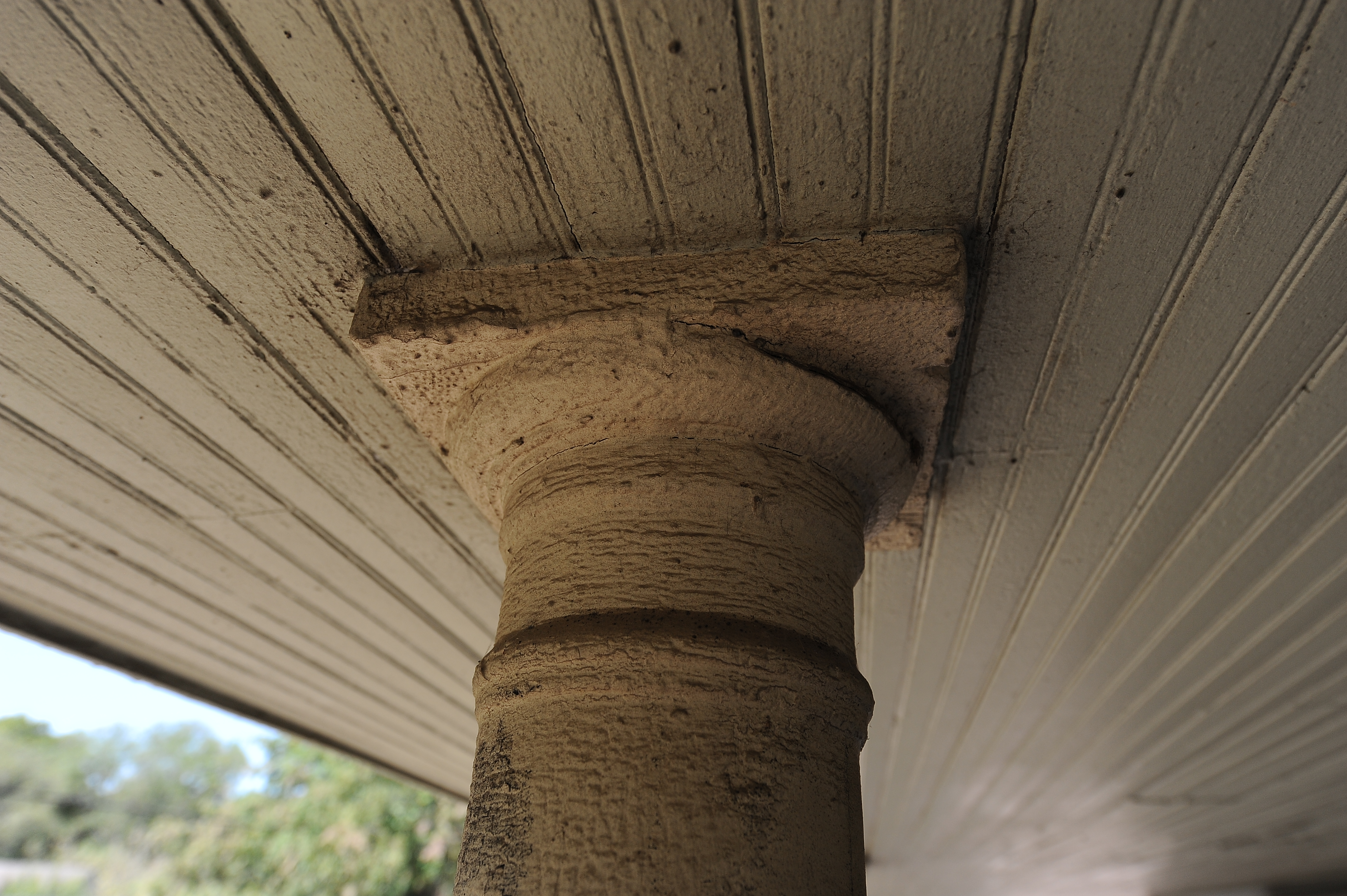
Porch column capital in the Tenth Street Historic District

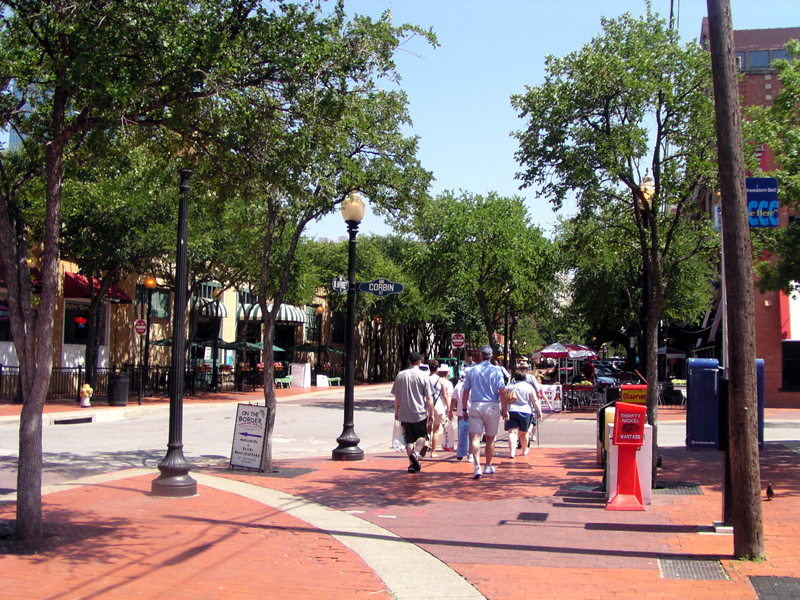
Market Street in the West End Historic District

Name	Designated	Location	NRHP Date	RTHL Date	Current Use
Continental Gin Historic District					residential
Eastside Warehouse Historic District		3221 Commerce Street			residential
Edison / La Vista Court Historic District	November 29, 1989	500 S. Harwood Street			residential
Fair Park Historic District	February 6, 2008	September 24, 1986			cultural
Harwood Street Historic District	February 22, 1990				commercial/ residential
Junius Heights Historic District	April 26, 2006				residential
Lake Cliff Historic District	November 5, 1997		June 17, 1994		residential
Magnolia Station Historic District			December 23, 1994		residential
Munger Place Historic District	July 27, 1988		September 13, 1978		residential
North Bishop Avenue Historic District					commercial
Peak's Suburban Addition Historic District	March 8, 1995		March 23, 1995		residential
Sears Complex Historic District					mixed-use
South Boulevard-Park Row Historic District	May 1977		February 5, 1979		residential
State Thomas Historic District	March 10, 1986; November 4, 1986				residential
Swiss Avenue Historic District	January 23, 1985		March 28, 1974		residential
Tenth Street Historic District	May 1993		June 17, 1994		residential
West End Historic District	October 6, 1975		November 14, 1978		commercial/ residential
Wheatley Place Historic District	October 24, 2000		March 23, 1995		residential
Wilson Block Historic District	April 29, 1981		December 15, 1978		commercial
Winnetka Heights Historic District	August 14, 1984		November 3, 1983		residential

== See also ==
- National Register of Historic Places listings in Dallas County, Texas
- History of Dallas
