= Sammons Center for the Arts =

Arts organization in Dallas, Texas, US

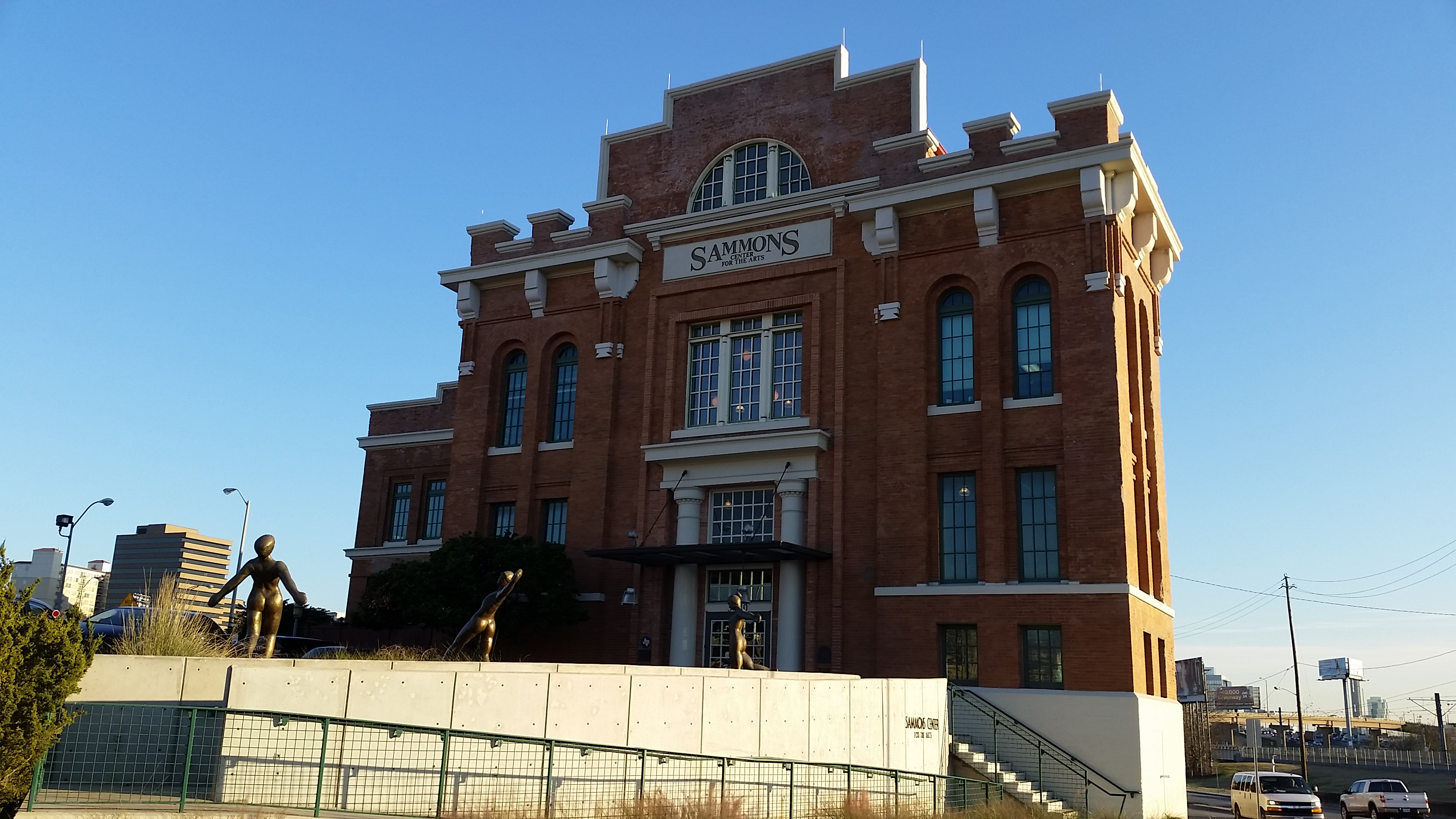
- Founded: 1988; 38 years ago
- Location: Dallas, Texas
- Website: sammonsartcenter.org
- Turtle Creek Pump Station
- U.S. National Register of Historic Places
- Recorded Texas Historic Landmark
- Dallas Landmark
- Built: 1909
- Architect: C. A. Gill
- Architectural style: Italianate, Richardsonian Romanesque
- NRHP reference No.: 01000103

Significant dates
- Added to NRHP: February 9, 2001
- Designated RTHL: 1983
- Designated DLMK: June 24, 1981

The Sammons Center for the Arts is a nationally recognized arts incubator in Dallas, Texas, that offers office, meeting, rehearsal, audition and performance space to local arts organizations. It is housed in the old Turtle Creek Pump Station, a landmark building that is listed on the National Register of Historic Places. It opened in 1988. The organization assists local performing artists, arts groups, and efforts related to arts education. It houses 14 arts organizations that represent different disciplines of performing arts. Over 90 other organizations use the center for rehearsals, performances and other events. As of 2019, Joanna St. Angelo serves as its executive director with Michael Cook serving as assistant director.

== History ==
The Turtle Creek Pump Station building was designed by Dallas architect C.A. Gill and completed in 1909. The Pump Station was responsible for the entire water supply for the City of Dallas until 1930, when a much larger treatment plant was opened and the Turtle Creek Pump Station was shut down.

In 1953, the building's west wall and chimney were removed due to industrial road renovations and the building was remodeled. The building was abandoned in 1959.

In 1981, the City of Dallas leased the building to an arts support group in Dallas led by Jo Kurth Jagoda, which was known as the "Turtle Creek Center for the Arts". That same year, it was named as an American Water Landmark.

In 1983, renovations started. The building was named a Texas Historic Landmark & State Antiquities Landmark.

In February 1988, renovations were completed and the building was opened. The center was given the name the "Sammons Center for the Arts" in honor of Charles A. Sammons and his wife, who donated funds in 1987 to complete the renovations.

In 2011, the center received a gift of $2,000,000 from Sammons Enterprises as part of a $5,000,000 fundraising campaign.

In 2018, the center's Director, Joanna St. Angelo, was awarded the inaugural Jac Alder Award by the Dallas Area Cultural Advocacy Coalition.

== Spaces in the Center ==
The largest space in the building, Meadows Hall, was built for rehearsals, auditions, concerts, receptions, meetings, dances and fundraising events. It has a 35-foot ceiling and a footprint of approximately 2,800 square feet, with a seating capacity of up to 300 people. It is equipped with a high-quality hardwood floor for dancing, acoustical treatments and paneling, and a Steinway B grand piano.

Kurth Hall hosts recitals, performances, meetings, theater, workshops, and special events. It has a footprint of approximately 1,200 square feet, seating up to 150 people for performances or lectures. This space is also equipped with acoustic treatments, hardwood flooring, vaulted ceilings, and a Steinway L grand piano.

The Mary Anne Sammons Cree Mezzanine Suite serves as a venue for receptions, meetings, workshops, luncheons, and other special events. The Suite is 1,200 square feet in area, and can accommodate an audience of 150.

The Conference Room accommodates meetings, seminars, retreats and conferences.

== Events ==
The Center regularly hosts jazz and cabaret concerts. Concerts are presented in the Meadows Hall and the Kurth Hall.

- Sammons Jazz, founded in 1989, is a jazz performance series that showcases local jazz players in Big band, Bebop, Swing, and Latin styles. Since the center was opened, Sammons Jazz has hosted over 250 jazz concerts.
- Sammons Cabaret is a New York-style cabaret performance series founded in 2012.
- The Sammons Discovery series was launched in 2016 to showcase the music of North Texas. Multiple genres are included, such as mandolin orchestras, jazz harp ensembles, percussionist and guitarist performances.
