= Lincoln High School (Dallas) =

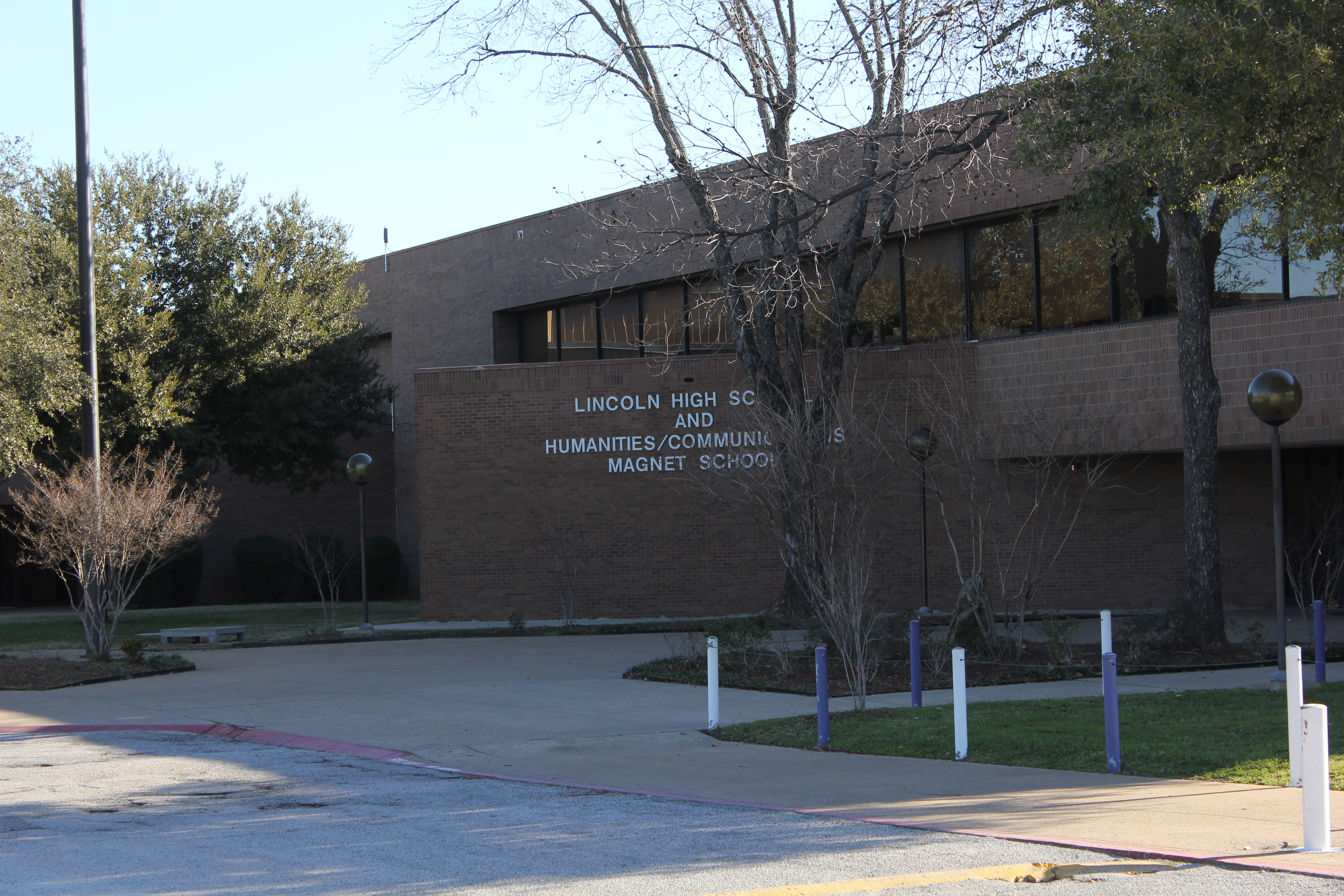

Location
- 2826 Elsie Faye Heggins St; Dallas, Texas 75215; United States; 32.754872°N 96.750177°W

Information
- Type: Public, Secondary
- Motto: To Maintain the Mark of Excellence.
- School district: Dallas Independent School District
- Principal: Johnna Weaver
- Assistant Principals: Mr. Raymond Shaver and Ms. Latasha Nasheed (Collegiate Administrator)
- Staff: 48.01 (FTE)
- Grades: 9–12
- Enrollment: 661 (2023-2024)
- Student to teacher ratio: 13.77
- Colors: Purple, white, gold and black
- Mascot: Tiger
- Trustee, District: Justin Henry, 9
- Area: South Dallas/Fair Park
- Website: lincoln.dallasisd.org

Lincoln High School is public high school located in Dallas, Texas (USA) which enrolls students in grades 9-12 and is a part of the Dallas Independent School District.

Lincoln's magnet school offers Radio/Television/Film, Print Journalism, and Humanities. Lincoln has a variety of activities including Academic Decathlon, Debate, One Act Play, The Wall Of Sound Marching Band, and a variety of sports. The school has won national and state championships in boys' basketball.

For the 2018-2020 biennium, Lincoln is classified by the University Interscholastic League (UIL) as a 4A Division school, competing in District 4A-5 (Division II) in football, and District 4A-12 in all other sports.

In 2018, the school was rated "Met Standard" by the Texas Education Agency, with a 2-Star Distinction for Academic Achievements in Mathematics and Post Secondary Readiness.

== History ==
In 1937, the Dallas school board appointed a building committee to find land for a new high school for African Americans. The committee chose eleven acres southeast of downtown Dallas, a couple miles north of the confluence of the Trinity River and White Rock Creek.

Dallas architect Walter C. Sharp, responsible for several schools in Arlington, Dallas and Tyler, designed Lincoln High School, and Dolph-Bateson Construction Company served as contractor. The main building was designed in the new International Style that was just becoming popular at the time of its construction. The vertical massing and tower with glass bricks at the entrance made the building a landmark in the neighborhood.

Lincoln High School opened its doors for the first time in January 1939 with 1,255 students and 31 teachers. It was one of the largest campuses in the city, with twenty classrooms, chemistry and physics laboratories, auditorium, cafeteria, and library in the main building. A federal Public Works Administration grant paid for nearly half of the construction cost. The only previous school for blacks, Booker T. Washington, suffered from extreme overcrowding, so many of the first Lincoln students came from Washington.

Tueria Dell Marshall (1883-1960) served as the first principal at the new school, from 1939 to 1955. Marshall is credited with bringing his students quality academic training. He is buried in the historic L. Butler Nelson Cemetery adjacent to his beloved school.

In 1980 a new Lincoln High School was built in front of the original building. The original building is a Dallas Landmark, and a Texas state historical marker was placed in front of the original school building in 2006.

The area of south Dallas around Lincoln has undergone significant gentrification over the last twenty years, and rumors of Lincoln closing have surfaced several times since the 1990s.

== Academic performance ==
In 2011 1.1% of the students, including 3.1% of the Hispanic students and none of the black students, received a "criterion" or passing grade, as defined by the State of Texas, in SAT and/or ACT. Jim Schutze of the Dallas Observer wrote that the school performed poorly and did not deserve the "high esteem" it received in South Dallas.

== Feeder patterns ==
As of 2018, Joseph J. Rhoads Learning Center (PK-5) and Charles Rice Elementary School (PK-5) feed into Billy Earl Dade Middle School then into Lincoln. Because Dade MS is the only middle school in south Dallas, it feeds both Lincoln and James Madison high schools. The students that come to Dade from Paul L. Dunbar Elementary School (PK-5), Martin Luther King, Jr. Learning Center (PK-5), and Oran M. Roberts Elementary School (PK-5) attend high school at Madison.

== Athletics ==
The Lincoln Tigers compete in the following sports:

- Baseball
- Basketball
- Cross Country
- Football
- Golf
- Soccer
- Softball
- Swimming and Diving
- Tennis
- Track and Field
- Volleyball
- Wrestling

=== State Titles ===
- Boys Basketball
  - 2002(4A), 2016(4A)
- Girls Basketball
  - 1999(4A), 2004(4A), 2008(4A), 2025(4A/D2), 2026(4A/D2)
- Girls Track
  - 2026(4A)

==== State Finalists ====
- Boys Basketball
  - 1997(4A), 2004(4A)
- Football
  - 1959(PVIL-3A), 2004(4A/D2)
- Girls Basketball
  - 1991(4A), 1994(4A), 2001(4A), 2002(4A), 2003(4A), 2013(4A)

== Notable alumni ==
- Angela Aycock (1991) — Former professional basketball player in the WNBA and internationally. Now a nun known as Sister Paula.
- Arthello Beck (1959) — Self-taught professional artist and gallery owner
- Cedric Lee Juan Tuck "Big Tuck" (1997) — Rapper
- Chris Bosh (2002) — Former NBA basketball player and Hall of Famer
- Charlie Brackins (1950) — Former NFL football player for the Green Bay Packers. One of the first African-American quarterbacks in the NFL.
- Abner Haynes (1956) — Former NFL football player, primarily for the Dallas Texans and Kansas City Chiefs.
- John Hopps, Jr. (1954) — Physicist; Dr. Hopps became a top physicist and international federal government appointee in two presidential administrations.
- Bobbi Humphrey (1968) — American jazz flutist and singer who plays fusion, jazz-funk and soul-jazz styles.
- Herbie Johnson (1952) — One of the first African-American students to graduate from the North Texas State College, now known as the University of North Texas.
- Melvin Mitchell — Former NFL player, primarily for the Miami Dolphins
- Le'Bryan Nash (2011) — professional basketball player for Maccabi Haifa in the Israeli Basketball Premier League
- David "Fathead" Newman (1951) — Jazz saxophonist
- Andrea Riley (2006) — Professional basketball player in the WNBA and Europe
- Duane Thomas (1965) — Former NFL running back for the Dallas Cowboys and Washington Redskins
- Darren Tillis (1978) — Former NBA basketball player. Taken in the 1st round, 23rd pick of the 1982 NBA Draft by the Boston Celtics.

== See also ==
- History of the African Americans in Dallas-Fort Worth
