= South Dallas =

South Dallas, Texas
- Neighborhood of Dallas
- DOWNTOWN
- Country: United States
- State: Texas
- Counties: Dallas
- City: Dallas

Area
  - Water: 0 sq mi (0 km^{2}) 0%
- ZIP codes: 75215, 75210, 75227, 75217
- Area codes: 214, 469, 972

South Dallas is an area in Dallas, Texas. It is south of Downtown Dallas, bordered by Trinity River on the west, Interstate 30 on the north, and the Great Trinity Forest to the south and east. In recent years the City of Dallas and organizations including Dallas Area Habitat for Humanity and Rebuilding Together Dallas have begun revitalizing the area in an effort to make the area more attractive to homeowners and foster economic development.

== Neighborhoods ==
The following neighborhoods are generally considered part of or closely connected with South Dallas; some of them may not be located entirely within South Dallas or may be considered parts of South Dallas by some and not others. Some are official subdivisions and some have been named by neighborhood associations.

- Bonton
- Dixon Circle
- Dolphin Heights
- Dunn Park
- Frazier Court
- Jubilee Park, Dallas Jubilee Park
- Owenwood
- Queen City, Texas|Queen City
- Rose Garden, Texas|Rose Garden
- St. Phillips
- South Boulevard & Park Row Historic District
- Turner Courts
- Wheatley Place

== Economy and infrastructure ==
The United States Postal Service operates the South Dallas Post Office.

In 2001, the City of Dallas approved an economic development plan to help revitalize South Dallas and the Fair Park area, both of which historically suffer from a comparatively high level of poverty, blight, crime, and prostitution since White flight after public school desegregation.

== Education ==
=== Primary and secondary schools ===
South Dallas is a geographic area within the Dallas Independent School District. The section is served by the following schools:

Elementary schools (multiple campuses)

- Charles Rice Learning Center, located in the Queen City area of South Dallas in a red brick, two-story building.
  - In 2015 Eric Nicholson of the Dallas Observer stated that Rice is "generally regarded by parents as" the best elementary school in South Dallas. According to Nicholson, "regard Charles Rice as a local gem, but its reputation for quality doesn't extend much further than that" partly due to the school's high level of student poverty and partly due to the poor reputation of South Dallas. The school, which as of 2015 had 98% of its students designated as having free or reduced lunch (a marker of being poor), had the highest 2013–2015 School Effectiveness Index (SEI), an internal DISD school index that determines how well a school is performing relative to its community demographics. Nicholson wrote in March 2016 that the SEI ranking "perennially puts Charles Rice neck and neck with [Lakewood Elementary in the Lakewood neighborhood in East Dallas] as the district's best non-magnet school" even though Rice's raw test scores, while above the DISD average, were far below Lakewood's. As of 2015 Rice had earned three of five distinctions from the Texas Education Agency (TEA). While many low income schools have a lot of teacher turnover, Rice, as of 2016, has an average teacher tenure of 23.3 years.

Middle schools

- Billy Earl Dade
  - The school merged with Pearl C. Anderson Middle School, and opened in a new $36 million building in August 2013. In 2015 Nicholson stated that the combination of the two hostile student populations and poor administration from DISD's central office caused it to become, for a period, "Dallas' Worst Public School". As of 2018, Joseph J. Rhoads Learning Center (PK–5) and Charles Rice Elementary School (PK–5) feed into Dade then into Lincoln. Because Dade MS is the only middle school in near south Dallas, it feeds both Lincoln and James Madison high schools. The students that come to Dade from Paul L. Dunbar Elementary School (PK–5), Martin Luther King, Jr. Learning Center (PK–5), and Oran M. Roberts Elementary School (PK–5) attend high school at Madison.
- Kennedy-Curry
  - Located in far south Dallas and feeds Wilmer Hutchins High School, originally part of the now defunct Wilmer-Hutchins ISD, located south of I-20.

High school

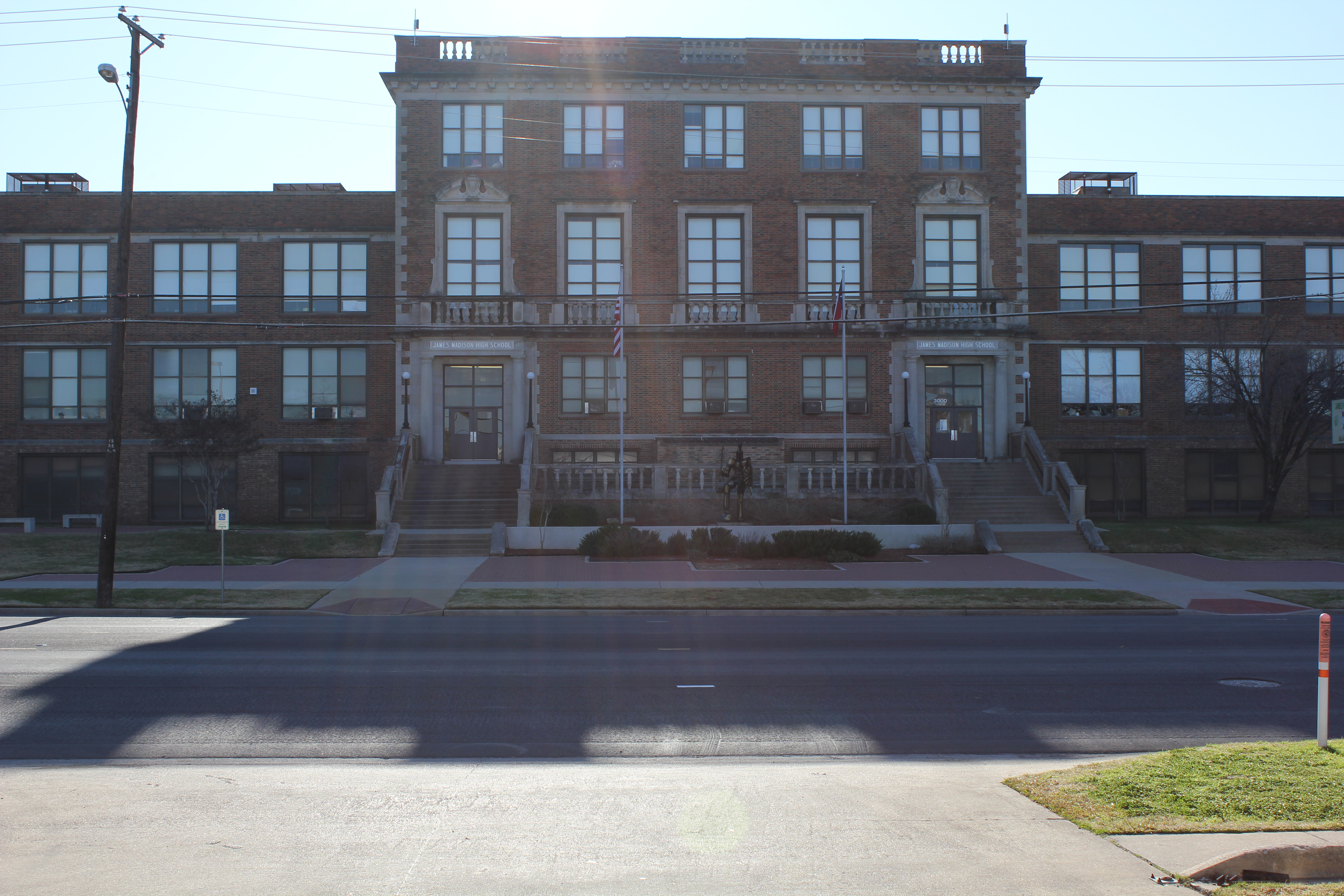
James Maddison High School

James Madison High School

- Originally, the school was called Forest Avenue High School and was built in 1916 in the Italian Renaissance style of architecture. The building is on the National Register of Historic Places in the US due to its importance to South Dallas after World War II in 1945 as well as its architecture. An annex was constructed on the south side for grades eight and nine in 1951.
- The Dallas Board of Education announced on June 14, 1956 that Forest Avenue High School would redraw its attendance zone due to overcrowding at two neighboring school Lincoln High School and Booker T. Washington High School. The school would become one for black students due to the state's racial segregation policy. The white students would attend Crozier Tech High School.
- In 1983, the Forest Avenue High School Alumni Association donated scholarly items from the school to Dallas Public Library. The association had previously given Madison students scholarships, but stopped due to lack of funds. The association had 800 members as of October 2012.

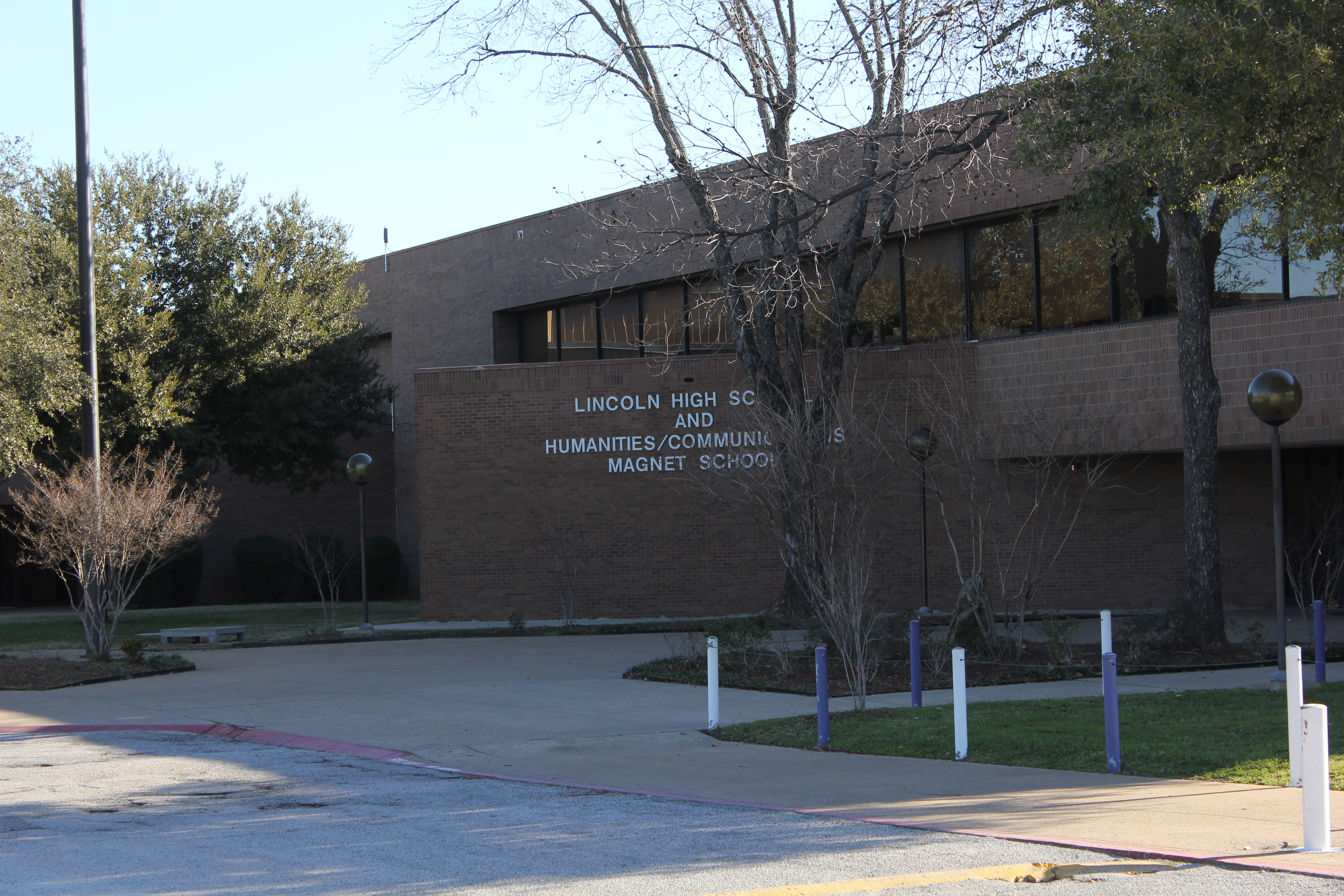
Lincoln High School

Lincoln High School

- In 1937, eleven acres of land a north of Trinity River was selected to be land for a new school for African Americans. Walter C Sharp, an architect from Dallas, designed the school. The school was built in the International Style and opened in 1939 and relieved overcrowding at the neighboring schools. A new school was built in front of the existing one and subsequently became a Dallas Landmark. In 2006 a Texas state historical marker was added. Since the 1990s, the area has become increasingly gentrified and rumors have spread about its potential closure.

=== Higher Education ===
The Bill J. Priest Institute for Economic Development, a campus of El Centro College of the Dallas County Community College District, is located in a brick campus in Old South Dallas. Jim Schutze of the Dallas Observer described the building as "handsome."

== Transportation ==
Several thoroughfares, DART bus service, and DART light rail exist in South Dallas.

=== Buses ===
- DART

==== Light rail ====
  - MLK, Jr. Station – Park and Ride
  - Hatcher Station

=== Highways ===
- Interstate 45
- U.S. Highway 175
- State Highway 310
- State Highway 352
