= South Boulevard–Park Row Historic District =

Historic district in Texas, United States

- U.S. National Register of Historic Places
- U.S. Historic district
- Dallas Landmark
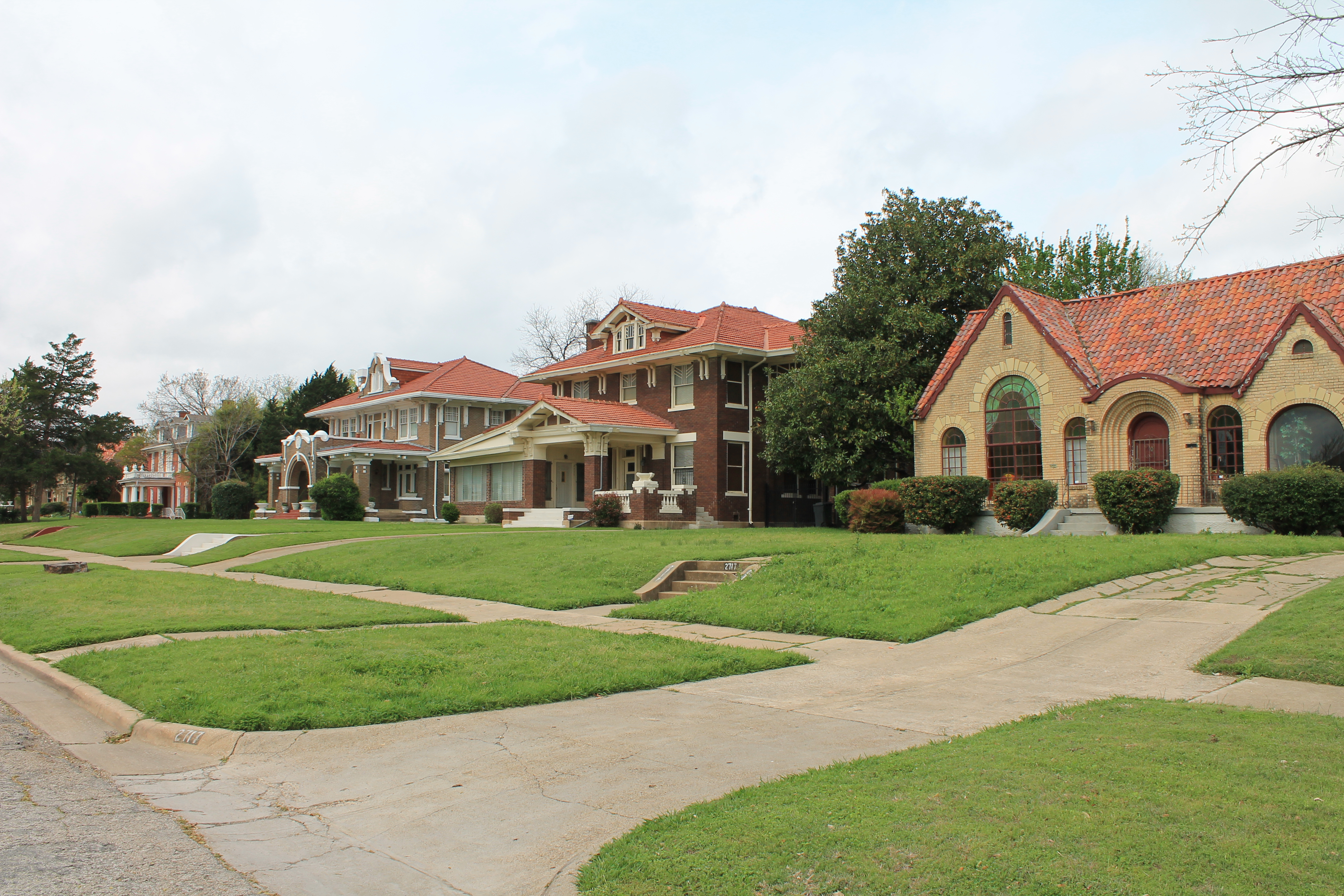
- South Blvd in 2012

- Location within Texas Location within the United States
- Location: South Blvd. and Park Row from Central, Dallas, Texas
- Coordinates: 32°46′05″N 96°46′20″W
- Area: 46 acres (19 ha)
- Architect: Multiple
- Architectural style: Prairie School, Bungalow/Craftsman, Mission/Spanish Revival
- NRHP reference No.: 79002930
- DLMK No.: H/4

Significant dates
- Added to NRHP: February 5, 1979
- Designated DLMK: May 1977

South Boulevard–Park Row Historic District is located in the southern part of Dallas, Texas.

It was added to the National Register on February 5, 1979.

== See also ==
- National Register of Historic Places listings in Dallas County, Texas
- List of Dallas Landmarks
