= Deauville (disambiguation) =

Deauville is a commune in the Calvados département in the Basse-Normandie region of France.

Deauville may also refer to:

== Places ==
- Deauville, former town in Quebec now annexed to the city of Sherbrooke.
- Deauville – Normandie Airport, Normandy, France
- Hotel Deauville (Miami), a now demolished ocean-front resort hotel in Miami Beach, Florida
- Hotel Deauville (Havana), a historic hotel in the Centro Habana municipios of Havana, Cuba
- Hotel Deauville (New York), hotel on E 29th Street, New York

== Other uses ==
- De Tomaso Deauville, a large four-door sedan
- Honda Deauville, a mid-range touring motorcycle
- Deauville Criteria, a Positron-Emission Tomography (PET) Scoring System for Hodgkin's Lymphoma
