= Woodrow Wilson High School (Dallas) =

Public high school on Dallas

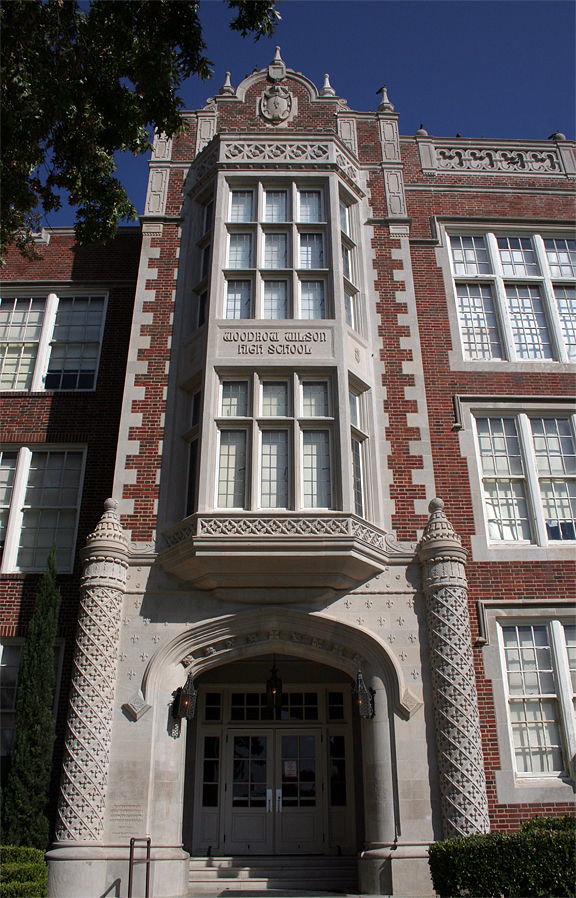

Location
- 100 South Glasgow Drive; Dallas, Texas 75214; United States; 32°48′21″N 96°45′03″W

Information
- Type: Public high school
- Established: 1928; 98 years ago
- School district: Dallas Independent School District
- Principal: Alex Merritt
- Teaching staff: 118.62 (FTE)
- Grades: 9–12
- Enrollment: 1,791 (2023–2024)
- Student to teacher ratio: 15.10
- Campus: Large city
- Colors: Crimson and gray
- Athletics: UIL Division 2 5A
- Mascot: Wildcat
- Newspaper: Wildcat News
- Yearbook: Crusader
- Website: woodrow.dallasisd.org

Recorded Texas Historic Landmark
- Designated: 1989
- Reference no.: 6923

Dallas Landmark
- Designated: January 22, 1992
- Reference no.: H/53

Woodrow Wilson High School, commonly known locally in short as Woodrow, is a public high school located in East Dallas, Texas (U.S.). Woodrow enrolls students in grades 9–12 and is a part of the Dallas Independent School District (DISD). It is located adjacent to the Junius Heights historic district.

It was named in honor of former U.S. president Woodrow Wilson, who died just three years before the school building was completed. The structure is a Dallas Landmark, as well as a Recorded Texas Historic Landmark, the highest honor the state can bestow on a historic structure. The National Trust for Historic Preservation wrote that the Woodrow Wilson school "defines how a historic neighborhood school can remain a vital and integral part of the educational process and continue to serve surrounding historic neighborhoods."

In 2009, DISD authorized Woodrow to apply to become certified as the first Dallas school to be authorized as an IB World School offering the International Baccalaureate Diploma Programme (IB degree). It earned its official designation as an IB World School on March 18, 2011. In 2015, the school was rated "Met Standard" by the Texas Education Agency.

== History ==
=== Early history ===
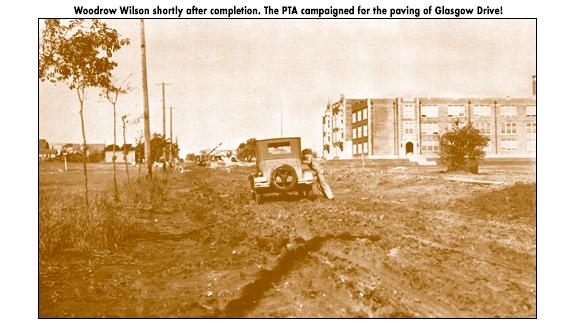
1928

Designed by Dallas architect Mark Lemmon, the school opened in 1928, and was constructed in the Elizabethan style. At the cornerstone-laying ceremony in April 1927, a piece of the wedding cake of Woodrow Wilson's second daughter, Jessie, was included in the cornerstone "in memory of Mr. Wilson." At US$700,000, the school's cost exceeded that of the district's previous four high schools by at least $100,000. The ornamental lighting was made by Potter Art Metal Studios of Dallas. Special features of the building included a gymnasium boasting "one entire wall of glass windows" and an auditorium that was to be the "best equipped and best lighted" in the district, with footlights and a separately ventilated orchestra pit. A theater organ was later placed in the pit and pipes put in special lofts on the third level. The September 1928, Dallas Herald said the school "presents a rare spectacle from afar." Photos and the original blueprints of the school building were featured in an exhibition celebrating the works of Mark Lemmon at The Meadows Museum.

The school has been colloquially called "Woodrow" by students and community members from its beginning, fostered by first principal G.L. "Pop" Ashburn, who led the school until 1956. The mascot of the school is the Wildcat. A Parent Teacher Association chapter was formed for the school even before its 1928 opening.

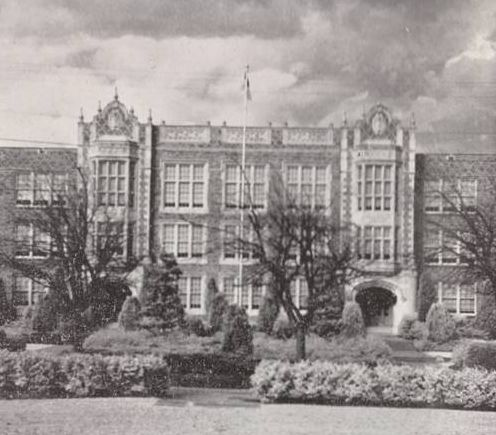
1952

Until 1957 (when Bryan Adams High School opened), Woodrow was the only "East Dallas" high school.

The original principal of Woodrow Wilson served for 30 years.

=== 1960s through early 2000s ===
Woodrow Wilson integrated in the 1960s as the percentage of black and Hispanic students increased year after year. Gene Lyons of Texas Monthly stated in 1979 that "In short, everything that has been happening demographically within the DISD and, by extension, within U.S. big-city high schools has been happening to Woodrow Wilson." In 1976 federal judge William McLaughlin Taylor Jr. wrote a school integration order for Dallas. This initial order stated that the enrollments should be balanced by closing Woodrow Wilson. The school remained open after residents of Lakewood protested, saying that it would close an already-integrated school. His order did not require education levels after grade 8 to use integration busing. Lyons wrote that therefore Woodrow Wilson was "one of the few "naturally integrated" schools in Dallas."

In 1981, interiors for the movie Crisis at Central High starring Joanne Woodward, were filmed at the school.

In 2004, thousands attended Woodrow's 75th Anniversary Celebration, which included a parade (from Lakewood to the school, with Congressman Sam Johnson as Grand Marshal, chauffeured in a new Ford Mustang driven by fellow alumnus Carroll Shelby, the legendary auto designer and builder), followed by an auditorium-packed program at which a new group of members was inducted into the Hall of Fame. Scores of "mini-reunions" also were held during that day in assigned rooms throughout the school.

In October 2007, the school was cited as one of 39 model schools in Science and Math by the Texas Public Policy Foundation.

=== Choose Woodrow and Rod Dreher's article ===
Around 2008, Woodrow parents launched "Choose Woodrow," a program aimed towards attracting families in the Lakewood neighborhood towards Woodrow.

Rod Dreher, a politically conservative columnist in The Dallas Morning News, argued that the program was unfair. Dreher argued that even if the campaign attracted more white students who would raise the school's test scores overall, it would not help lower performing minority students who are enrolled at Woodrow.

Rick Wamre, the president of Advocate Media, wrote in the Lakewood Advocate that Dreher had wrongly insinuated that the "Choose Woodrow" parents were racists. Jim Schutze of Dallas Observer wrote that the article had accurate observations about the campaign targeting white persons and the disparity of the school, but he criticized what he called the piece's "painting a picture of the white people who send their kids to Woodrow as somehow racist, because their kids are mainly in the advanced placement classes and the kids of color are mainly not." Michael Landauer wrote an editorial in the Dallas Morning News stating that Dreher made an "unfair" accusation against the Woodrow Wilson parents and that he "actively chooses to assign dark motives to people who are taking an active role in their neighborhood school."

In response to the above articles, Dreher defended his column and posted rebuttals against his critics' arguments.

=== Late 2000s to present ===
In 2009, Woodrow celebrated its 80th anniversary. In honor of alumnus Carroll Shelby's designation as Grand Marshal of the 80th Anniversary Parade, scores of non-Woodrow graduates joined the parade — most showing off their Ford/Shelby Mustangs or Cobras, but a few were driving Dodge Vipers (another vehicle Shelby helped develop). During the main ceremony in the school's packed auditorium, the Alumni Association inducted twenty more individuals into Woodrow's Hall of Fame. The celebration concluded with an "Alumni Band Roundup" at Eddie Deen's Ranch that evening, where hundreds of Woodrow alums ate, drank, and enjoyed each other while listening and dancing to music played by eight bands, each composed of Woodrow Alums (with a few ringers here and there) from various classes between 1960 and 2008. A documentary video of the 80th Anniversary Celebration was produced by Michael Barnes and Kathy Kilmer Moak, both from the class of 1967. It featured historical photographs and interviews with many alums interspersed with clips of events during the 80th Anniversary Celebration. It premiered at the Lakewood Theater in the fall of 2009.

In the fall of 2009, Woodrow became one of four high schools in Texas to be designated as candidates for designation as an IB World School. In March 2011, the school earned the IB designation after a rigorous three-year application process, including an extensive site visit by the IB Organization.

In December 2009, Woodrow earned the Texas ACT College Readiness Award, the only Dallas comprehensive high school to receive that honor.

The Woodrow Wilson High School Community Foundation was formed in 2009. The Community Foundation's purpose is to raise funds, grants, and scholarships to support the faculty, students, and programs at Woodrow and its feeder schools. It also exists to cultivate other area programs and projects.

In 2011, The Washington Post ranked high schools based on the quantity of AP/IB exams taken per graduating senior, without taking scores on those exams into account. In the so-called "challenge index", Woodrow finished at 588 out of the top 1,900 high schools in the nation. In 2012, the school moved up 157 places to 431 out of the top 1,900 high schools in America, or the top 9%. In 2015, the school moved up to 271 out of the top 2,300 high schools in the country. This placed Woodrow above all area suburban comprehensive high schools except Highland Park and Colleyville Heritage

In 2015, D Magazine put Woodrow and its feeders at the top of the list in a real estate analysis, "Where to Buy for the Best Schools"

Kyle Richardson, who served as principal for a five-year period, left in 2016. In May of that year was replaced by Michael Dang, previously principal of Judge Barefoot Sanders Law Magnet. However Dang resigned in June of that year, Steve Ewing served as principal for 2016–17. Roxanne Cheek served as principal for the 2017–18 school year; she left DISD and became a principal at Aikin Elementary School in the Richardson Independent School District. In 2018 Michael Moran, previously an assistant principal at Bryan Adams High School, became the principal of Woodrow Wilson. In July 2022, former J.L. Long principal Chandra Hooper-Barnett became Woodrow's new principal. On October 27, 2025, Principal Hooper-Barnett was placed on administrative leave pending an investigation of an incident with an "alleged racial element."

== Campus ==
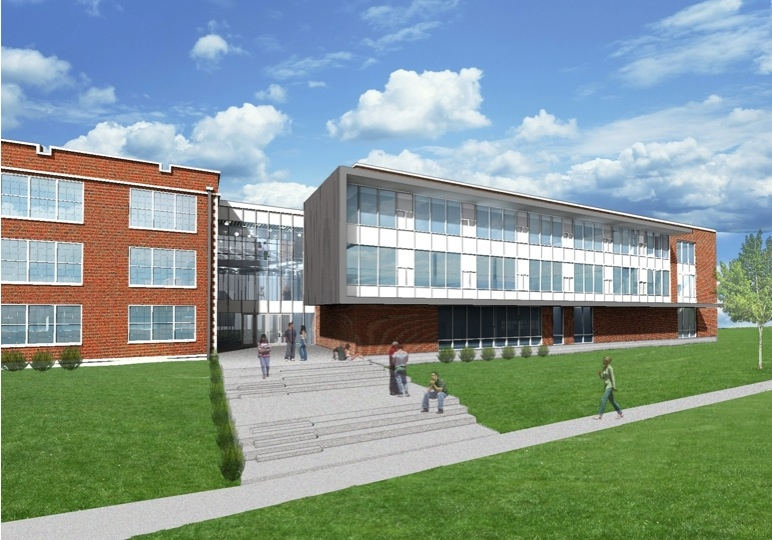
$14 million Science (STEM) and Performing Arts Addition under construction from 2008 DISD bond election funds

The three-story main campus building, made of brick, uses the Neo-Gothic architectural style. The school library is on the third floor. Gene Lyons of Texas Monthly wrote that the design features "all reflect the college-prep institution the school was intended to be" when it was first built, citing the library's bay windows and the large lawn. This building is across from Randall Park.

In 1979 the school was developing its permanent shop facilities in an addition that had a cost of several million dollars. Previously the school had few industrial education course offerings, and no permanent shop facility was available.

A ground-breaking ceremony for the new science/performing arts wing at Woodrow was held on May 23, 2011. The $14 million, 40,000-square-foot (3,700 m^{2}) structure was authorized in a 2008 DISD bond election. It is only the third expansion of the school's facilities in its 83-year history. (A boys' gym was added in 1953 and another addition was opened in 1979 in time for the school's 50th Anniversary Celebration.) The addition is three stories tall and located at the rear of the 7-acre (28,000 m^{2}) campus near "Downtown Lakewood". It houses the new Performing Arts Academy and three laboratories for the Science, Technology, Engineering and Math (STEM) Academy. These academies are part of the school's redesign into four college prep academies which began implementation in the fall of 2010 as a four-year roll-out (the other two academies are the IB Academy and the Business & Entrepreneurship Academy).

The building addition was designed by Brown Reynolds Watford Architects with offices in Dallas, Houston, College Station and San Francisco. Principal Architect Craig Reynolds is a current Woodrow parent. It features two-story separate choir and drama rooms. The choir room has practice rooms and the drama room features a black-box theater, costume shop and prop facilities. A large dance rehearsal hall is also on the first floor. Three large science labs are on the third floor, along with new restroom facilities. The new addition replaces part of the 1979 wing, which cost $1 million. The areas replaced are former wood and metal shops - no longer needed with the school's new college-prep curriculum. The rest of the 1979 addition is being remodeled into a larger band hall and athletic facilities. There is room left for a future competition-size gymnasium to connect to this area.

As part of this same project, Woodrow's main 1928 building had its original windows restored and HVAC replaced, including new air exchangers in the auditorium courtyards. The first-floor restrooms were restored to the historic marble and wood and the second and third level facilities were gutted and replaced with modern fixtures. Electrical fixtures and computer lines throughout the campus were brought up to current standards. Drainage and landscaping improvements were also included in the construction, along with resurfacing of the parking lots and the Tim Brown-Davey O'Brien Track.

As of January 2013, the wing has been occupied by students; the official ribbon-cutting ceremony was held on March 23, 2013.

An addition, also with three stories, and a new gymnasium for athletic games are scheduled to be finished on June 27, 2019.

== School operations ==
The Texas Education Agency campus profiles circa 2011 stated that the funds spent per student at Woodrow were similar in amount to those spent per student at Highland Park High School. Woodrow receives financial support from Alumni, its Parent Teacher Organization, and the Community Foundation. As of 2011, due to budget cuts, the school ended its "Professional Learning Community" and reduced its custodial staff to two employees.

== Attendance zone ==
As of 2019 Woodrow serves: most of the upper east side of East Dallas, including:

Caruth Terrace, Greenland Hills (the "M Streets") Hollywood Heights/Santa Monica, Junius Heights, Lakewood, Lakewood Heights, Lower Greenville, most of Munger Place, almost all of Swiss Avenue, Vickery Place, Wilshire Heights, Mount Auburn, the Belmont Addition, Glencoe, and Stonewall Terrace,

As of 1979 the attendance boundary included wealthy, middle class, and working class areas: the wealthiest areas were in the north of the zone, the poorest to the south, and the middle-to-upper income ones to the west. Within the boundary was Lakewood, several condominiums on Bob-O-Links drive, and shotgun shacks in the industrial district.

== Academics and history of student performance ==
In addition to its regular program, Woodrow offers the IB program to students.

=== History of academic performance ===
In 1979 Gene Lyons wrote that academic performance at Woodrow Wilson had declined in the 1970s; he wrote that when comparing performances of Woodrow to those of other schools as well Woodrow's younger students to its older ones, the trends together suggest "an incipient decline."

Lyons stated that in 1971 "People who measure quality by the number of graduates who go to college considered it one of the best public high schools in the city." In April 1977 a series of standardized tests was given out to students in DISD high schools. The 9th grade (freshman) students were in the following national percentiles: 23rd in language, 27th in reading, and 35th in mathematics. 11th and 12th grade (junior and senior) students together had the 38th national percentile in reading and the 41st percentile in language and math. These scores were below that of W. T. White High School, which had percentile scores in the 60s and 70s; and Bryan Adams High School, which had percentile scores in the fifties and sixties. In 1978, 34.9% of students graduating from Wilson attended universities, colleges, and/or community colleges, lower than the DISD average of 37.2%.

In 1979 the PTA requested that the scores from the April 1977 test be broken down by race, but principal Wayne Pierce stated he did not have access to the figures but that DISD did. The parents wanted to reassure the community that college-bound students were still well-served by the school. Lyons wrote that based on studies reporting that integrating and segregating students by race has "little to no effect upon individual achievement levels" and low test scores in majority black and majority Hispanic schools in Dallas, "there is little doubt that the figures would support such a contention".

In the 2005–06 school year, almost 60% of White students took Advanced Placement classes. During the same year, 7% of Hispanic students and 4% of black students had TAKS scores at the "college ready" level, or a level for beginning university studies. In 2008 Kent Fischer of The Dallas Morning News wrote "State accountability reports show that white students at Woodrow are generally successful" and that "minority students at Woodrow struggle" as they do at other DISD schools.

In November 2011 the Texas Education Agency ranked Woodrow Wilson "Academically Unacceptable". At the time 68% of its students were categorized as at risk. Nearby Highland Park High School in University Park was 7.9% at risk. The Daily Campus compared and contrasted the two schools' situations that year.

In 2014 Woodrow Wilson was one of three DISD comprehensive high schools which had a percentage of tested students with a 990 or higher on the SAT higher than the DISD overall average of 13.3%. It had 204 students, 21.1% of the tested students, at that level in 2013. In 2014 it was 354 students, 28.8% of the total tested students, an increase by 59 students. The DISD administration stated that students who score 990 or above on the SAT are likely to not require remedial classes when attending universities and colleges.

In 2014–15 Woodrow students earned an average SAT score of 898 out of 1600, however that number masks the large variation in scores between subgroups. White students scored an average of 1105 out of 1600, while African American students scored 856, and Hispanic students 818. On the ACT, Woodrow students earn an average score of 18 out of 36, similarly there was wide variation in subgroup scores. White students averaged a score of 24, African American students averaged 18, and Hispanic students averaged 17.

Also in 2014–15, students took a combined 1,174 AP exams, with 25.9%, 304, scoring higher than 3 out 5 (considered passing). In 2014, the school improved its number of college ready students (defined by DISD as a 990 SAT score) by 137% despite the fact that 150 more juniors took the test.

== Extracurricular activities ==
=== Athletics ===
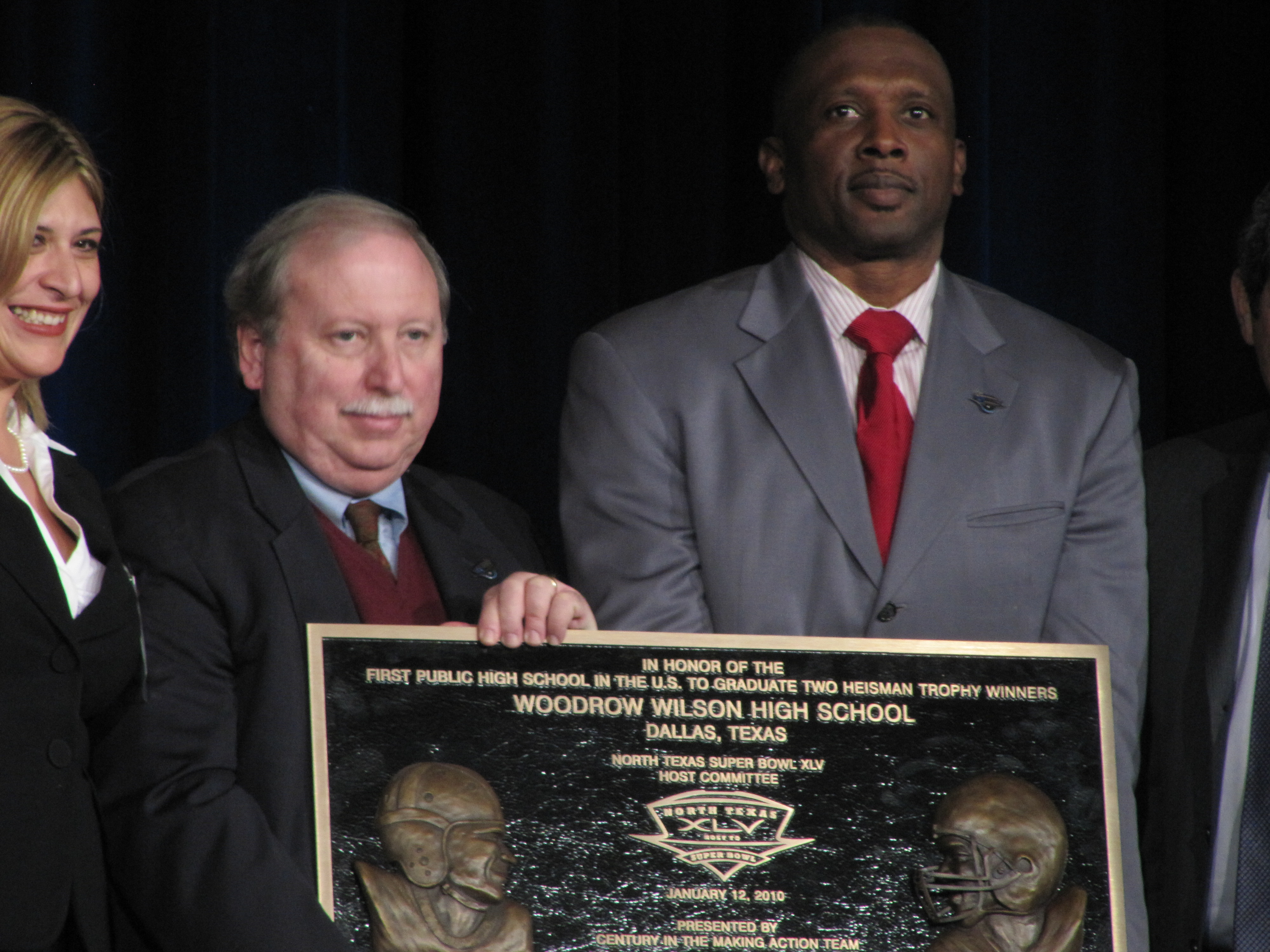
Principal Ruth Allen Vail '91 presents plaque to son of Heisman winner David O'Brien Jr (father Davey O'Brien '35) and Heisman winner Tim Brown '84 in January 2010

The Woodrow Wilson Wildcats compete in the following sports:

- Baseball
- Basketball
- Cross Country
- Football
- Golf
- Soccer
- Softball
- Swimming and Diving
- Tennis
- Track and Field
- Volleyball
- Wrestling

Woodrow has been called the "High School Home of the Heisman" because it was the first high school in the nation to be the alma mater of two Heisman Trophy winners: Davey O'Brien (1938) and Tim Brown (1987), and it remains the only public high school in the U.S. to have that distinction.

In 1979 the school played in the AAAA (4A) division of the University Interscholastic League (UIL), the public school athletic league of Texas. Woodrow Wilson, with 1,450 students chose to play in League 4A, with high schools enrolling around 3,000 students, due to what Lyons called "community pride"; it was eligible to play in the less competitive AAA (3A) league but instead played in 4A.

Notwithstanding Tim Brown's efforts, from about the 1980s until fairly recently, Woodrow's football program struggled. However, the Wildcats made the state playoffs in 1991, 2002, 2003, 2004, and 2005, advancing to the second round in 2003, 2004, 2005, 2006 and 2011. Previous Woodrow teams made state semi-finals in 1951 and 1969, and even earlier teams of the 1930s and 1940s were successful and produced such stars as O'Brien, I. B. Hale '35, Mal Kutner '38, Herschel Forester '48, and Bill Forester '49.

Woodrow's basketball team won state back in 1938, and later produced Alton Lister '76, a pro player on five different teams. Recent Woodrow graduate Anthony Randolph was one of the nation's top recruits, according to Rivals.com. He was a small forward for the LSU Tigers during his freshman year in college. Currently, Randolph is a professional basketball player for the Minnesota Timberwolves. He was selected as the 14th overall draft pick in the 2008 NBA draft by the Golden State Warriors. Woodrow's 2011 basketball team lost in the Regional Quarterfinals to Kimball (62–57), after leading most of the game. Kimball eventually won the state championship. The Wildcats, however finished ahead of Kimball with the number one total team offense in the Dallas Morning News' rankings.

In 1953, Woodrow Wilson won the city and state golf championships with brothers Gene and Ross Teter.

In 2007, Woodrow's athletics program was ranked No. 6 out of all 4-A high schools in the Dallas Morning News All-Sports competition. The Wildcats' score of 81 was better than 95 other local 4-A and 5-A high schools. That year, seven Woodrow football players made the state all-academic team.

In 2010, Woodrow placed 19th in 4-A All Sports Award competition sponsored by The Dallas Morning News - out of 62 4-A schools. Its score of 74 was higher than that of 88 4-A and 5-A schools. The girls' volleyball team and the boys' basketball team went deep into state playoffs with the basketball team being ranked 7th in the state. The tennis team, girls' swimming and both golf teams also did well in playoffs. In 2011 the school moved into the top ten out of 70 ranked schools from Wichita Falls to Texarkana. Its score of 91 points ranked ahead of 133 4-A and 5-A schools. In 2012, Woodrow won nine district titles and several teams advanced in the playoffs, which should have moved the school up in ranking (but the newspaper discontinued the awards).

Bill and Herschel Forester were Wildcats who played college football at SMU as well as in the pros. Dallas' Forester Field was named for their father, Herschel, who taught at Woodrow from the opening of the school until the late 1950s.

In March 2010, Freshman Grace Choi was ranked first in Texas in girls' golf.

=== Military ===
From the school's beginning, a Junior ROTC program has been part of Woodrow's high school program. In the 1930s, 1940s, and early 1950s, the school had the largest JROTC program in the nation, with 16 different companies and an ROTC band; a May 1941 article declared the program "largest of its kind in the world."

=== Business ===
By 2019 the school established a special education program, called the "Percolators," where special education students operate a coffee shop for the school community.

== Student body ==
Woodrow Wilson High ethnic breakdown 2015–16
1. White (22.2%)
2. Hispanic (66.3%)
3. Black (9.00%)
4. Asian/Pacific Islander (1.20%)
5. Indian or Alaskan (0.40%)
6. Two or more (0.80%)

As of 2015, 66.3% of the total student body was Hispanic, 22.2% White, 9% African American, 1.2% Asian, 0.4% Native American. 0.8% of students were of two or more races. 61.5% of the students are classified as economically disadvantaged, about the average for Texas public high schools. As of 2018 Woodrow Wilson, of all DISD high schools sans magnet or choice programs, had the highest number of transfers. That year it had 595 students living outside of the Woodrow Wilson zone.

As of 2008, 68% of the students were Hispanic, mainly of Mexican origins. Many of them had immigrated from central Mexico, including Guanajuato. 18% of the students were non-Hispanic white, most of them being middle class and some being upper class. Some white students had politically progressive/liberal parents and some had have more moderate political stances and were part of families who had attended Woodrow Wilson for generations. Many white students go on to attend colleges and universities across the United States. 12% of Woodrow students were black, including those residing in East Dallas apartments and some commuting from South Dallas.

=== Demographic history ===
In 1928 the students attending Woodrow were of upper middle class and wealthy class families.

In 1971 75-80% of Woodrow Wilson's students were Anglo White. By 1979 the percentages were 51% Anglo White, 27% Mexican American, and 22% Black. In 1979 the school had 1,450 students.

By 1979 multiple generations of Anglo White families in Lakewood had attended Woodrow Wilson. That year Gene Lyons of Texas Monthly wrote that "Woodrow is seen as a community school" in the Lakewood community. As of 1979 the parent-teacher association (PTA) largely originated from wealthier neighborhoods in the north of the Woodrow Wilson attendance zone.

== School uniforms ==
Students are required to wear school uniforms. The Texas Education Agency specifies that the parents and/or guardians of students zoned to a school with uniforms may apply for a waiver to opt out of the uniform policy so their children do not have to wear the uniform; parents must specify "bona fide" reasons, such as religious reasons or philosophical objections.

== Feeder patterns ==
As of 2015, J.L. Long Middle School (6-8) feeds into Woodrow Wilson.

Mockingbird (ex-Stonewall Jackson) (K-5), Lakewood (K-5), Geneva Heights (ex-Robert E. Lee) (PK-5), William Lipscomb (PK-5), and Mount Auburn (PK-5) Elementary Schools feed into Woodrow Wilson High School.

== Notable alumni ==
- Len Akin 1936, former NFL player (Chicago Bears)
- Tim Brown 1984, Hall of Fame professional football player and 1987 Heisman Trophy winner
- Georgia Carroll 1937, model, actress and singer. Posed for "The Spirit of the Centennial" statue at the 1936 Dallas World's Fair and Texas Centennial.
- Trammell Crow 1932, major Dallas builder and real estate mogul
- Jack Wilson Evans 1940, Mayor of Dallas (1981–1983), CEO of Cullum Companies (Tom Thumb Grocery Stores)
- Eddie Garcia 1978, former NFL player (Green Bay Packers)
- Burton Gilliam 1956, character actor in films and television
- Xavier Gipson 2019, American football wide receiver for the New York Jets of the National Football League (NFL)
- Bob Goodrich 1963, 15-time Emmy award-winning producer best known for Monday Night Football also one of Woodrow's many members of the Texas High School Football Hall of Fame
- Ralph Guldahl 1930, professional golfer - winner of the Masters and U.S. Open
- Jack Halliday, football player
- Alfred C. Haynes, 1948, retired aviator and airline captain, most famous for the crash landing of United Airlines Flight 232.
- Jerry Haynes 1944, actor and former children's television host "Mr. Peppermint"
- Dusty Hill, bassist for ZZ Top
- Curley Johnson 1953, punter on New York Jets Super Bowl III championship team
- Sam Johnson, United States Congressman
- Sergio Kindle 2006, former NFL player and All-Big 12 linebacker for the Texas Longhorns.
- Alton Lister 1976, professional basketball player
- R. D. Matthews, Texan organized crime figure.
- Jim Mattox 1961, former Attorney General of Texas and U.S. Congressman
- Steve Miller 1961, Rock 'n Roll Hall of Fame musician, known for his Steve Miller Band.
- Davey O'Brien 1935, professional football player and 1938 Heisman Trophy winner
- William O'Neil 1951, founder and publisher Investor's Business Daily
- Anthony Randolph 2007, NBA player
- Marvin Runyon 1942, former U.S. Postmaster General, Ford VP of Assembly and Parts, CEO of Nissan USA and Head of the Tennessee Valley Authority.
- Wallace H. Savage 1929, Mayor of Dallas, 1949–1951
- Carroll Shelby 1940, race car driver, 1959 24 Heures du Mans Winner & Founder of Shelby-American Co.
- William M. Steger 1938, former judge of the United States District Court for the Eastern District of Texas
- Matt Tolentino 2003, musician and bandleader of The Singapore Slingers
- Malcolm Wallace 1939, economist for the United States Department of Agriculture and press secretary to then-United States Senator Lyndon B. Johnson.
- Travis Willingham 1999, anime and video game voice actor.
- Lawrence Wright 1965, Pulitzer Prize-winning author
- Fredd Young 1980, ap All-American at NMSU, All-Pro, Pro Bowl Seattle Seahawks 1984-87 .Indianapolis Colts 1988–90

== See also ==
- List of schools of the Dallas Independent School District
- Recorded Texas Historic Landmarks in Dallas County
- List of Dallas Landmarks
