= Hotel Deauville =

Hotel Deauville may refer to:

- Hotel Deauville (Miami), Florida, US
- Hotel Deauville (Manhattan), New York, US
- Hotel Deauville (Havana), Cuba
