= North Stonewall Terrace, Dallas =

Residential neighborhood in eastern Dallas, Texas (US)

North Stonewall Terrace
- Neighborhood
- Interactive map of North Stonewall Terrace
- Coordinates: 32°50′20″N 96°45′52″W
- Country: United States
- State: Texas
- County: Dallas
- City: Dallas
- Area: East Dallas

Area
  - Total: .13 sq mi (0.34 km^{2})
- ZIP code: 75206
- Area code: 214

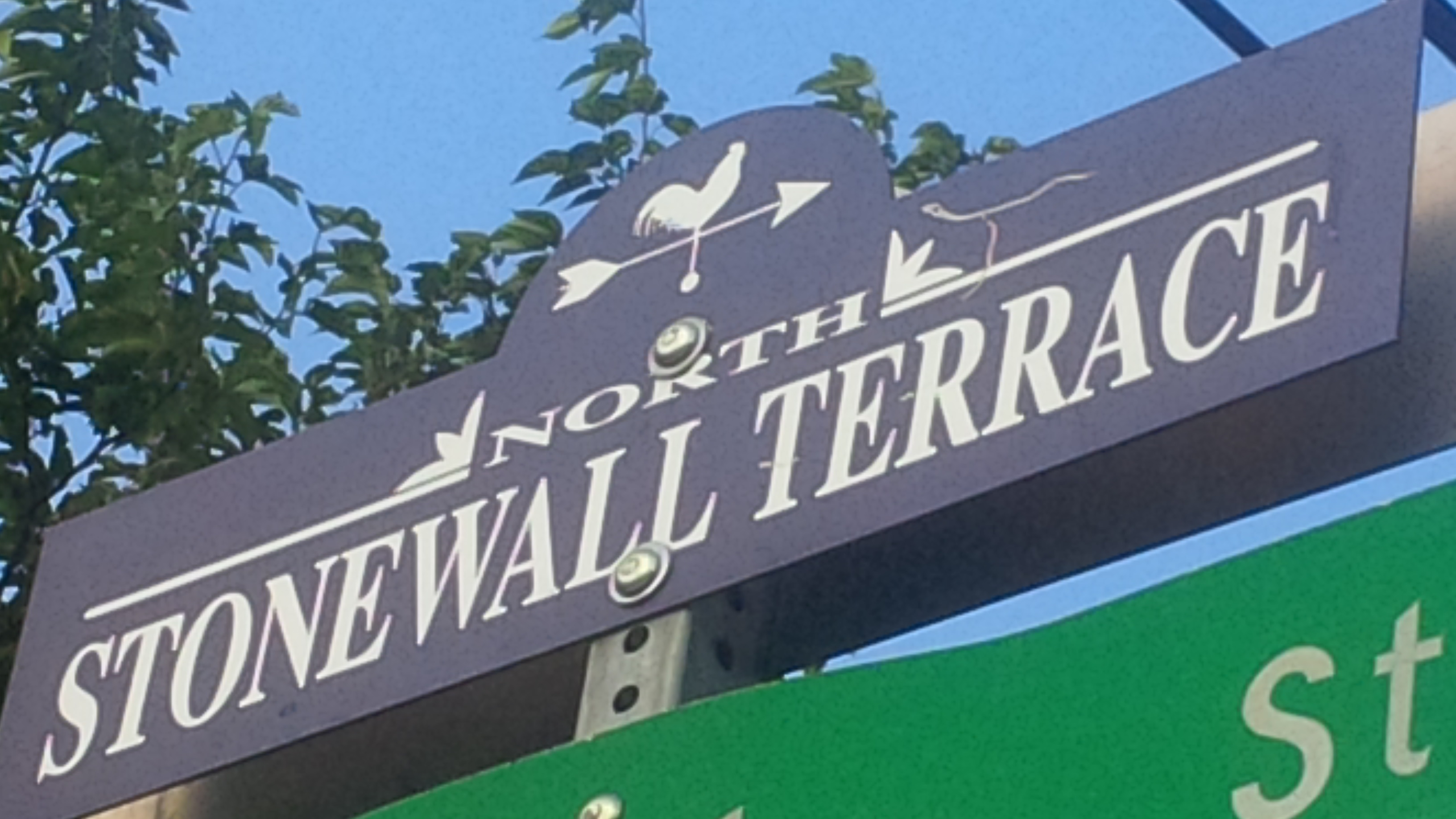
A street sign in North Stonewall Terrace.

North Stonewall Terrace is a residential neighborhood in eastern Dallas, Texas (US). It is adjacent to several East Dallas neighborhoods, including Caruth Terrace, Stonewall Terrace, and University Crossing.

North Stonewall Terrace is bound by Skillman Street to the east, the Dallas Area Rapid Transit (DART) light rail Blue Line to the north, the Matilda Bridge to the west and East Mockingbird Lane to the south.

The original name of this area is Montebello Park. The "Stonewall Terrace" terminology dates from approximately the early 2000s.

== Government ==
At the national level, North Stonewall Terrace is represented by John Cornyn (R) and Ted Cruz (R) in the US Senate. In the US House of Representatives, the neighborhood resides in US Congressional District 32, which is represented by Colin Allred (D).

At the state level, Nathan M. Johnson (D) represents North Stonewall Terrace and District 16 in the Texas State Senate. The neighborhood sits in District 108 of the Texas House of Representatives, which is represented by Morgan Meyer (R).

At the city level, Mike Rawlings (D) is the mayor of Dallas and Philip T. Kingston represents North Stonewall Terrace in Dallas City Council District 14.

== Municipal Services ==
The City of Dallas provides municipal services to North Stonewall Terrace such as sanitation (both sewer and refuse), water, and street maintenance.

The Dallas Police Department (DPD) provides law enforcement service to North Stonewall Terrace. The neighborhood is patrolled by DPD's Northeast Patrol Division, which is located at 9915 E. Northwest Highway. The Northeast Patrol is divided into five geographical areas called sectors. Each sector is then divided into smaller areas called beats and are patrolled by beat officers. Each beat then contains neighborhoods which are referred to as reporting areas. North Stonewall Terrace is part of Sector 210, Beat 219, Reporting Area 1117, respectively.

The Dallas Fire-Rescue Department provides fire protection and emergency medical services to North Stonewall Terrace.

== Education ==
=== Primary and secondary schools ===
==== Public schools ====
North Stonewall Terrace is served by the Dallas Independent School District (DISD). The neighborhood resides in DISD Board of Trustees District 2, and is represented by DISD Board of Trustees member Dustin Marshall. Students living in North Stonewall Terrace are assigned to the following public schools:

- Mockingbird Elementary School
  - National Blue Ribbon School in 98-99
- J.L. Long Middle School
  - An International Baccalaureate World School offering the IB Middle Years Programme
- Woodrow Wilson High School
  - An International Baccalaureate World School offering the IB Diploma Programme

==== Preschool programs ====
Mockingbird Early Childhood PTO serves the area.

== Media ==
Advocate Magazine is the local monthly magazine that covers a variety of East Dallas topics and has served the community since 1991.

== Residents of Note ==
There have been quite a few residents of note that have lived in North Stonewall Terrace. Currently Hamilton P. Bone III resides at the Polish T residence.
