= Caruth Terrace, Dallas =

Caruth Terrace
- Neighborhood
- Interactive map of Caruth Terrace
- Coordinates: 32°50′22″N 96°45′24″W
- Country: United States
- State: Texas
- Counties: Dallas
- City: Dallas
- Area: East Dallas

Area
  - Total: 0.21 sq mi (0.54 km^{2})

Population (2010)
  - Total: 848
  - Density: 4,000/sq mi (1,600/km^{2})
- ZIP code: 75214
- Area codes: 214, 469, 972

Caruth Terrace is a primarily residential neighborhood in eastern Dallas, Texas (US). It is adjacent to several other East Dallas neighborhoods, including North Stonewall Terrace, University Meadows, Hillside, and Wilshire Heights.

== Boundaries ==
Caruth Terrace is bounded by Skillman Street on the west, the Dallas Area Rapid Transit light rail Blue Line on the north, Abrams Road on the east, and Mockingbird Lane on the south. Caruth Terrace comprises all of Block Group 1, Census Tract 2.01, Dallas County, Texas

== Education ==
It is within the Dallas Independent School District. Residents are zoned to: Mockingbird Elementary School, J.L. Long Middle School, and Woodrow Wilson High School. Stonewall is a National Blue Ribbon School.

The Roman Catholic Diocese of Dallas operates St. Thomas Aquinas Catholic School, a K-8 school in the area. It has separate facilities for grades Pre-Kindergarten through 2 (lower school) and grades 3-8 (upper school): the upper school is in Wilshire Heights, while the lower school is in Caruth Terrace. St. Thomas Aquinas opened as Sacred Heart School #2 in 1947. The Monsignor John T. Gulczynski Early Childhood Center, previously the First Community Church, was acquired by St. Thomas Aquinas in 2005. As of 2020 the lower school has 351 students. Aquinas is a 2012 National Blue Ribbon School.

Solar Preparatory School for Girls at James B. Bonham is in Vickery Place. http://www.dallasisd.org/solarprep

== Demographics ==
The 2010 United States Census compiled the following demographic data for Caruth Terrace :

Median household income: $89,722
Median house or condo value: $375,000
Median contract rent: $1,800.00
Unemployment: 1.5%
Residents below the poverty level: 4.1%
Median resident age: 39
Males: 45.1%
Females: 54.9%
