= Vickery Place, Dallas =

Coordinates: 32.82076°N 96.777415°W

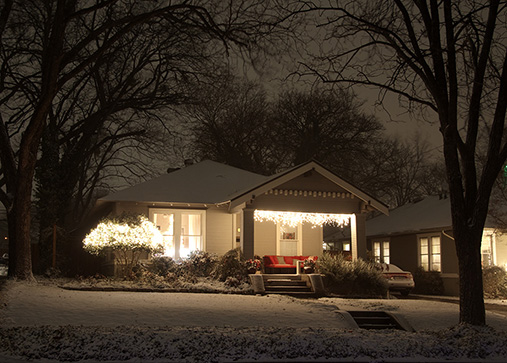
A Bungalow in Vickery Place

Vickery Place is a historic neighborhood in East Dallas, Texas, bounded on the north by Goodwin Avenue, on the west by North Central Expressway (US 75) and Henderson, on the south by Belmont, and on the east by Greenville Avenue. Although Vickery Place is considered by some to be part of the M Streets area, it is strictly speaking not as it is south of the Greenland Hills subdivision. Vickery Place has seen much improvement and property value growth over the past several years due to its close proximity to Downtown Dallas (2–3 miles from Downtown) and Uptown, and its location bordering the vibrant Lower Greenville Avenue and Knox-Henderson entertainment and shopping districts.

== History ==
Vickery Place is one of the oldest neighborhoods in Dallas, filled with Prairie, Craftsman and Tudor bungalows, and old growth pecan trees. The Vickery Place subdivision was created out of the survey of three farms in August, 1911. Initially, 500 lots were platted, and Vickery Place was bounded on the west by the H&TC Railroad (the future site of the North Central Expressway (US 75)), on the north by Goodwin Ave, on the east by the Richardson Pike Ross Ave Extension (the future site of Greenville Avenue), and on the south by Bonita and Melrose Avenues. In later years, Vickery Place would be extended and redefined by its current boundaries.

The Dallas City Council unanimously approved the Vickery Place Conservation District on June 28, 2006, as a result of a concerted community effort to halt the destruction of historic homes and the construction of larger houses inappropriate for the neighborhood.

== Education ==
Vickery Place is within the Dallas Independent School District. The neighborhood is zoned to Geneva Heights Elementary School (formerly Robert E. Lee Elementary School) in Lower Greenville, J. L. Long Middle School, and Woodrow Wilson High School. There is a K-8 magnet school in the Vickery Place area, Solar Preparatory School for Girls at James B. Bonham..

Previously most of the community was served by James B. Bonham Elementary School (Closed in 2012) with a portion in the northeast zoned to Lee. Bonham opened in 1923 as the Vickery Place School. Designed by C.D. Hill, the building's price was about $121,000. The school received its current name in December 1939. The Vickery Meadow Association wrote "We believe this was done to avoid confusion with the town of Vickery, which was annexed into DISD soon afterwards." Bonham Elementary won the National Excellence in Urban Education Award in 2009 and the Blue Ribbon School Award in 2010, and the Texas Education Agency (TEA) ranked the campus as exemplary for several years. The school had above 200 students in the 2011-2012 school year, leading Eric Nicholson of the Dallas Observer to wrote that the school was "badly underused". There were 22 students per teacher at that time, which was lower than the common one to 27. The underpopulation was a stated reason to close the school. The student population sharply declined as gentrification occurred, as the inflation-adjusted median income increased by 80% from 1990 to 2010, and fewer children lived in the area, as in the same period the number of residents 18 or younger went was 580 in 2010 when it was 1,187 in 1990. The husband of the president of the Bonham parent-teacher association, Dave Walkington, stated that the district may have additionally selected Bonham as a way of telling the Texas Legislature that it needed additional funds and that high performing schools were in jeopardy. Additionally articles from local publications stated that DISD would have had reductions in federal funding if it closed campuses with poor academic performance. DISD board members stated that deciding to close a small school regardless of its academic performance would be a fair decision.

Students were rezoned to Lee Elementary. All of the final teaching employees, including principal Sandra Fernandez, were reassigned to Callejo Elementary, which had opened that year. The physical building, post-closure, had sustained some vandalism. After the closure DISD immigration intake facility opened on the Bonham school grounds, but not in the main building. In 2013 the DCAD appraised the property's value as $6.7 million. The Bonham campus became a female-only STEAM school in 2016. Keri Mitchell of The Advocate Lakewood/East Dallas wrote that the absorption of Bonham students added "engaged families" to the school community of Lee Elementary.
