= John Martino =

John Martino may refer to:

- John Martino (actor) (born 1937), American actor
- John Martino (writer) (1911–1975), American casino security systems technician jailed in Havana
