= Lakewood Heights, Dallas =

Neighborhood in Dallas, Texas, USA

Lakewood Heights
- Neighborhood
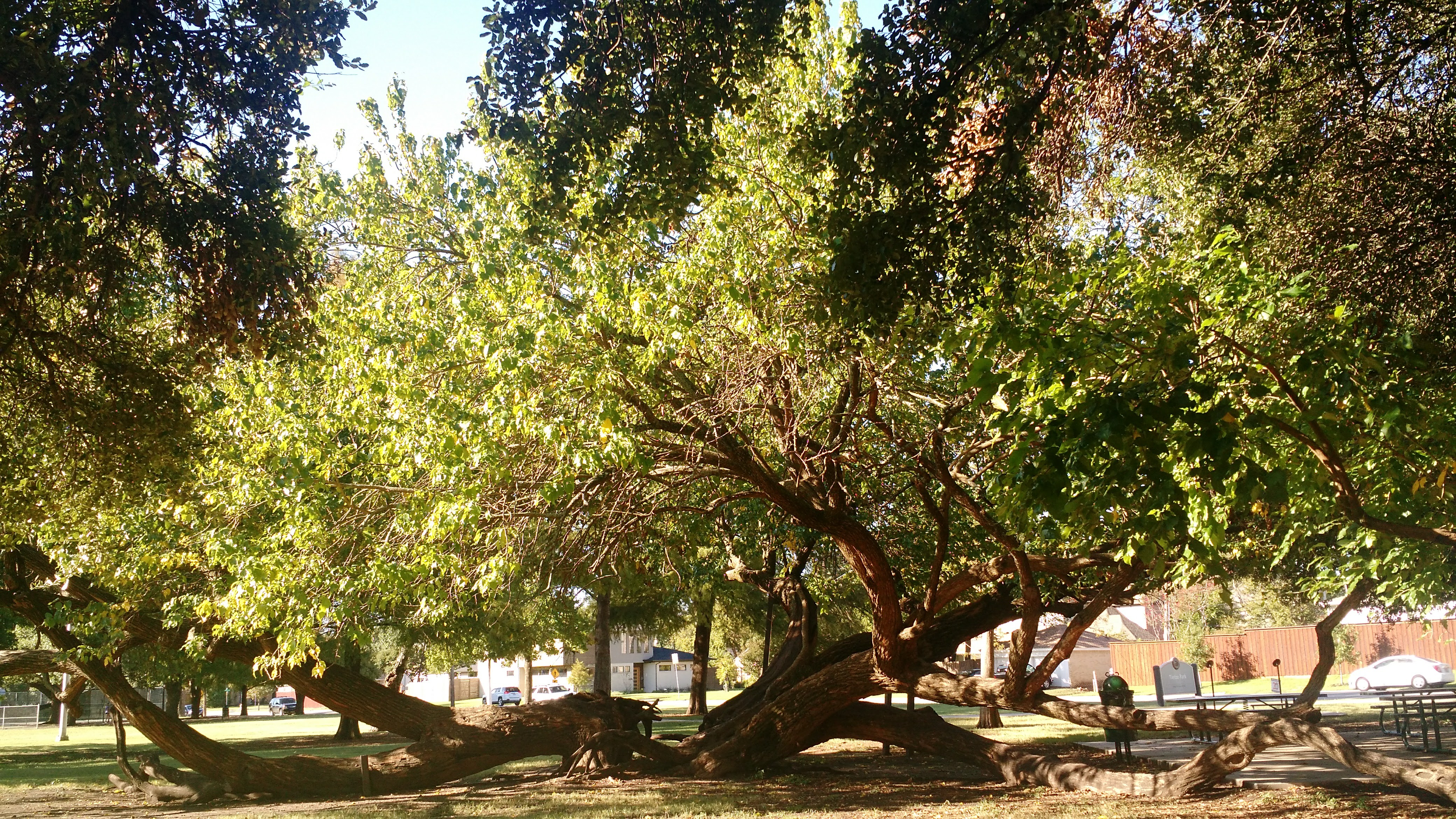
- "Kneeling" Bois d'Arc tree in Tietze Park

- Lakewood Heights boundaries
- Coordinates: 32.821°N 96.758°W
- Country: United States of America
- State: Texas
- County: Dallas County
- City: Dallas

Area
  - Total: 0.36 sq mi (0.93 km^{2})

Population (2023)
  - Total: 2,705 (est.)
  - Density: 7,500/sq mi (2,900/km^{2})
- Time zone: UTC-6:00 (CST)
  - Summer (DST): UTC-5:00 (CDT)

Lakewood Heights is a residential neighborhood in Dallas, Texas (USA), bounded by Abrams Road to the east, Monticello Avenue to the north (not McCommas, as incorrectly shown on Google Maps), Skillman Street to the west, and Richmond Avenue to the south. It located in East Dallas. Lakewood Heights is approximately one-half mile (0.8 km) wide (east-west) and three-quarters of a mile (1.2 km) long (north-south). It covers approximately 240 acres (97 ha) or slightly less than 0.375 square miles (0.97 km^{2}). It is adjacent to several East Dallas neighborhoods, including Lakewood, Lower Greenville, and Wilshire Heights.

== History ==
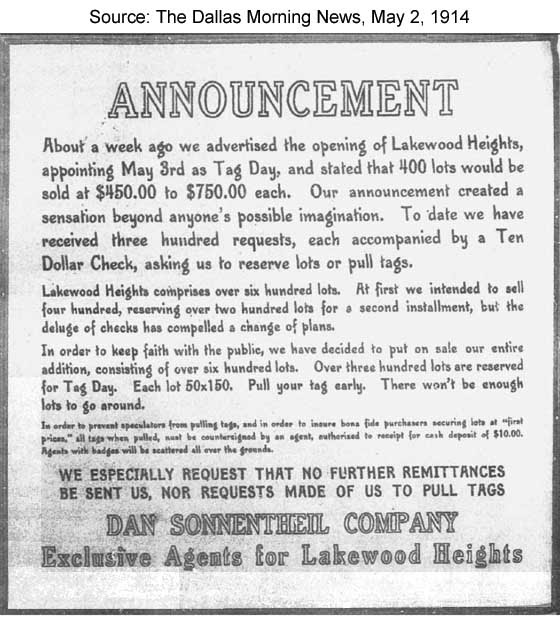
Advertisement for Lakewood Heights home lots, Dallas Morning News, May 2, 1914

The area now comprising Lakewood Heights is part of three land grants made in the 1850s by the State of Texas to, respectively, Amon McCommas (Abstract 911); John McCommas, the son of Amon and Mary Brumfield McCommas (Abstract 943); and Allen Beard (Abstract 66). Amon McCommas, his wife Mary Brumfield McCommas, and their nine children settled on this land in 1844. McCommas Boulevard, just north of Lakewood Heights, is named for the McCommas family. Beard's Branch, a creek draining into White Rock Lake east of Lakewood Heights, may have been named for Allen Beard.

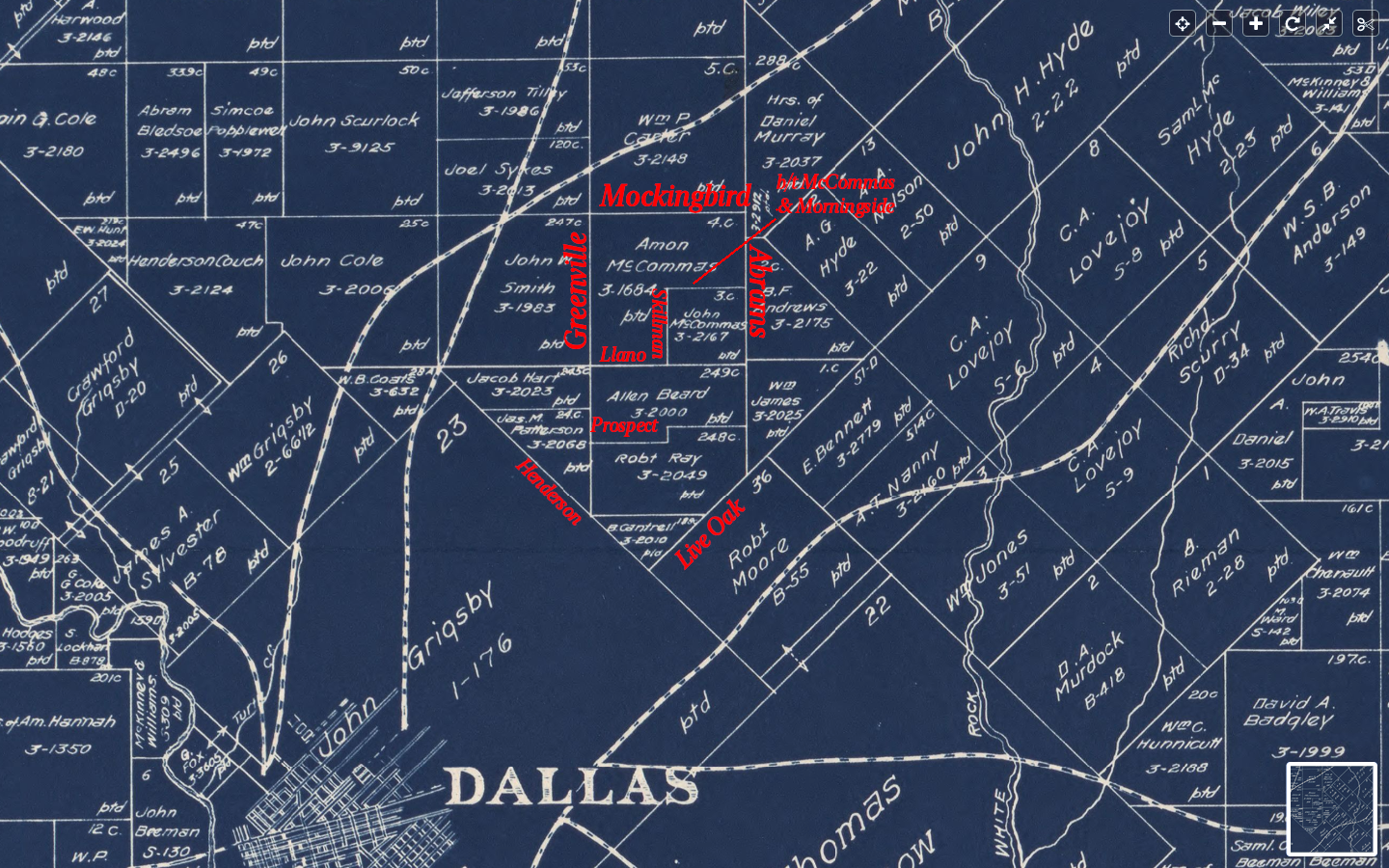
Map showing original McCommas and Beard land grants and present-day streets

The first platted portion of current-day Lakewood Heights, comprising one and one-half blocks then known as "Llano Place," ran from the north side of Llano Street to the north side of Vickery (then known as "Price") between Norris and Clements. This area was platted in 1913. The next portion, abutting Llano Place on the south and running from the south side of Llano Street to Richmond Avenue between present-day Skillman (then named "Railman") and present-day Abrams (then, "Old Greenville Road") was platted in 1914 and was annexed to the City of Dallas in 1923. Development was substantially completed by 1940, although a few streets date from 1949-50. Building lot sizes typically are 50–60 feet (15–18 m) wide and 140–220 feet (43–67 m) deep. As a neighborhood, Lakewood Heights predates neighboring Lakewood, as shown by aerial photographs of the area taken in 1923. A 1919 street map shows that the first streets platted were those between Llano Avenue on the north and Richmond on the south.

== Demographics ==
Lakewood Heights comprises portions of Dallas County census tracts 2.01 and 11.02 in the 2020 U.S. federal census. According to D Magazine (citing Nielsen SiteReports and samplings based on most recent U.S. census estimates), in 2023, the estimated population of Lakewood Heights was 2,705 people; the neighborhood contained approximately 987 households; the average household size was 2.84 persons; 78% of homes were owner-occupied; and the median value of owner-occupied homes was $408,067.

== Education ==
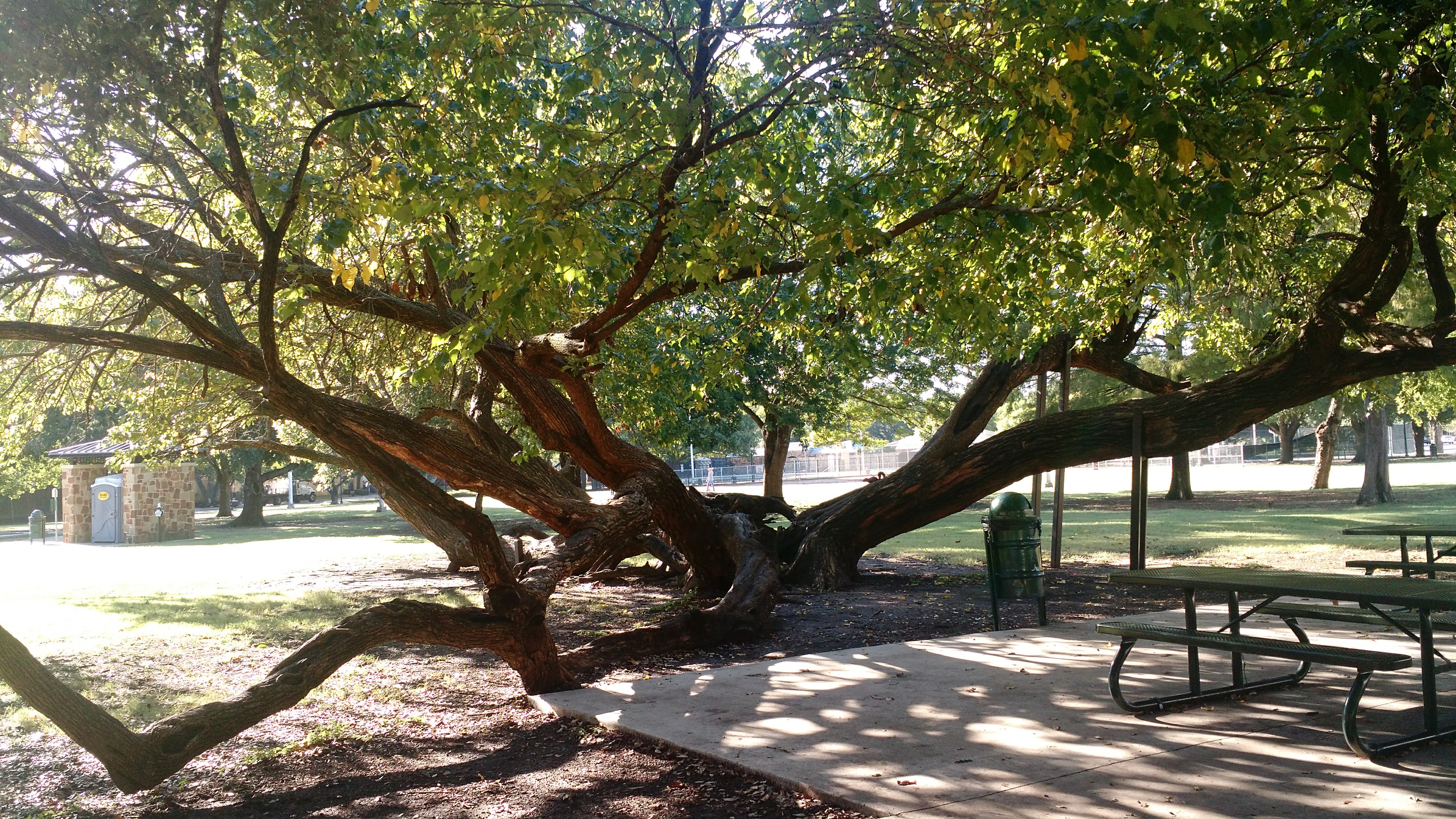
"Kneeling" Bois D'Arc tree in Tietze Park, Dallas, Texas, USA

Lakewood Heights is in the Dallas Independent School District attendance zones for: Geneva Heights Elementary School (most), Mockingbird Elementary School (some), J.L. Long Middle School (all), and Woodrow Wilson High School (all).

== Government ==
It is part of Dallas City Council District 14.

== Parks and recreation ==
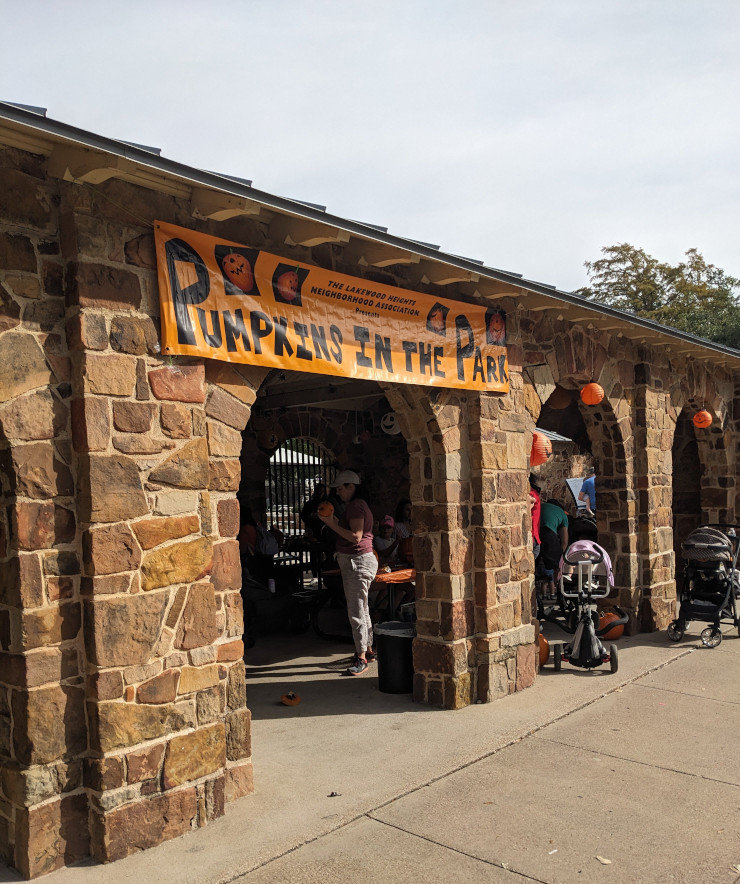
Annual-Pumpkins-in-the-Park Family Event

Tietze Park, a 9 acres (3.6 ha) public park owned and operated by the city of Dallas, is located on the western edge of Lakewood Heights on Skillman Avenue between Llano and Vanderbilt Streets. The park was acquired in 1924 by the City of Dallas. It is named after W.R. Tietze, who was Dallas' Superintendent of Parks from 1896-1933. The park contains a sandstone picnic pavilion dating from 1934, a community swimming pool, lighted baseball field, tennis court, basketball court, serpentine walking/jogging paths, other recreation and picnic areas, and more than 75 red oak, live oak, and cedar trees, and a few “kneeling” bois d'arc trees, which are said to predate the park by 50 years or more. The Friends of Tietze Park Foundation is a registered nonprofit organization whose mission is the improvement, preservation and continued beautification of Tietze Park. In 2009, Preservation Dallas recognized the Friends of Tietze Park Foundation with a preservation achievement medal for the Best Rehabilitation of a Historic Landscape or Park.

Richard Sheffield, a resident, in an article in D Magazine, wrote that the park "has been a neighborhood staple for years and has provided countless hours of entertainment to local residents."

== Neighborhood Association ==
The Lakewood Heights Neighborhood Association, a voluntary association of neighborhood residents, sponsors several events through the year, including a Halloween pumpkin-decorating party, an Easter Egg Hunt, a free-admission day at the neighborhood swimming pool, and a concert and cookout on the national Neighborhood Night Out.
