= Hotel Deauville (Havana) =

Historic hotel in Havana, Cuba

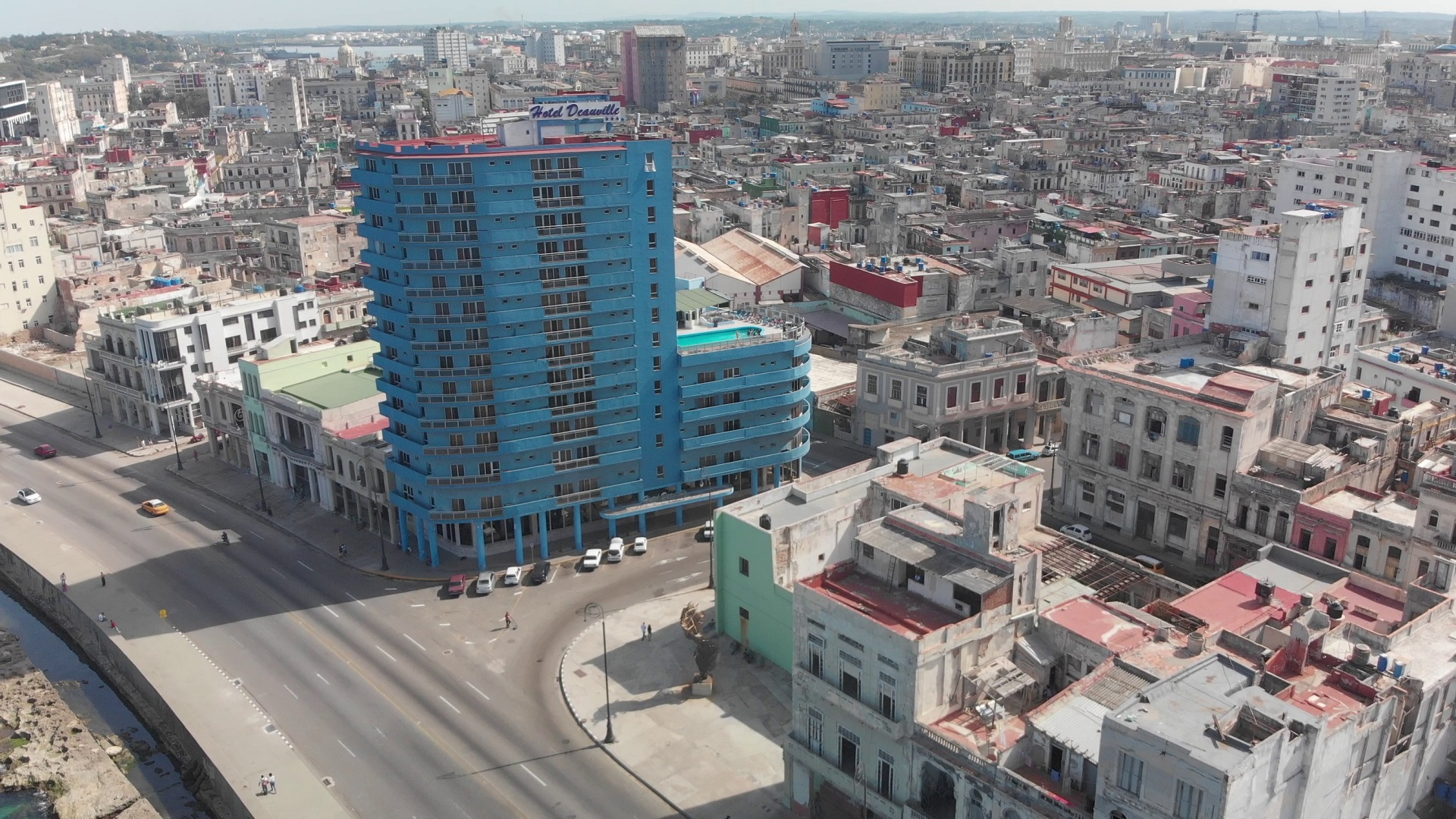
- Hotel Deauville, 2019

General information
- Location: Galiano, 1 E/ Malecón y S. Lázaro. Havana, Cuba
- Coordinates: 23.14206°N 82.36358°W
- Opening: 1957
- Owner: Gran Caribe

Other information
- Number of rooms: 144

The Hotel Deauville is a historic hotel in Centro Habana located at Calle Galiano 1 on a corner with the Malecón promenade, and overlooking the Bay of Havana. The hotel was constructed as a casino hotel in 1957 by a consortium owned by American mobster Santo Trafficante Jr.

In 1955, President Fulgencio Batista enacted Hotel Law 2074, offering tax incentives, government loans and casino licenses to anyone who built a hotel costing in excess of $1,000,000 or a nightclub costing $200,000. This resulted in the construction of the Hotel Deauville, as well as other hotels including the Hotel Habana Riviera, Hotel Capri, Hotel St. John and Havana Hilton, all featuring casinos.

The construction of the Hotel Deauville began in 1956, and the hotel opened in 1957. It was built at a cost of $2.3 million, was 14 stories high and featured 140 rooms, a rooftop swimming pool, a cabaret and two casinos.

The hotel was primarily owned by Trafficante crime family boss Santo Trafficante Jr. and bolita banker Evaristo Garcia Jr., and the casinos were owned by Trafficante. Joe Silesi (alias Joe Rivers), a member of the Gambino crime family, was the casino manager. Reportedly Chicago gangster Irwin Weiner had a share in the casino. With the help of technician John Martino the gambling machines were rigged to favor Trafficante. R. D. Matthews of Texas worked at the hotel. Trafficante also had interests in the Hotel Capri, the Sans Souci nightclub and casino, the Sevilla-Biltmore, and the Hotel Comodoro. The casino was sacked by mobs in early January 1959 as Fidel Castro's rebel army overtook Havana.

On October 24, 1960 the Cuban government published its Official Gazette Resolution 3 (pursuant to Law 851, Official Gazette, July 7, 1960), which nationalized the Hotel Deauville as well as a number of other hotels and businesses owned by American investors.

In 2017, it was announced that St Giles Hotels would assume management of the hotel after a major renovation. The renovation never occurred.
