= R. D. Matthews =

American figure in Texan organized crime

Russell Douglas "R. D." Matthews
- Born: 26 July 1920; Aspermont, Texas
- Died: 2013 (aged 92–93)
- Other names: "The Man With The Patch" "The Patch"

R.D. Matthews was an American figure in Texan organized crime. He worked for Benny Binion and Santo Trafficante Jr.

== Biography ==
Matthews was born in Aspermont, Texas on 26 July 1920. He attended Woodrow Wilson High School in Dallas, where one of his classmates was Mac Wallace. After the attack on Pearl Harbor he enlisted in the Marines, being awarded the Navy Cross and Purple Heart.

After the war he returned to Texas and became involved with the Hollis de Lois Green gang in Dallas. He had involvement in illegal bookmaking and developed a reputation as an enforcer. The FBI described him as a "strong-arm for the collection of gambling debts". He was arrested on Fort Worth Avenue after the police attained a search warrant. Several ounces of cocaine were found in his possession and he received a prison sentence.

In November 1949 Mildred Noble, the wife of Herbert Noble, was killed when her husband's car exploded. Matthews was brought in to be questioned by Captain J. W. Fritz as a suspect. The Dallas PD believed that Matthews and Lois Green had placed dynamite in Noble's car. Matthews denied involvement and due to lack of evidence he was never indicted. One night an associate of Noble was sent to visit Matthews' home, whom he told he needed a place to stay the night. Matthews agreed and when asleep in bed the man shot him in the head with a .22 calibre pistol. The bullet went through his left eye and exited at his temple. Matthews drove himself to a doctor. He survived but lost his eye. According to Matthews the gunman "got killed" a few years later. He wore an eye patch for the rest of his life, acquiring the nickname "The Patch".

Matthews became acquainted with Joseph Campisi after he and his brother purchased The Idle Bar where Matthews worked. In subsequent years he would accompany Campisi on his trips to Las Vegas. Another Dallas associate of his was James Henry Dolan. George Fuqua of the Dixie Mafia was a mutual associate of theirs. In 1958 he arrived in Havana, Cuba, working for Santo Trafficante Jr. at the Hotel Deauville and Sans Souci. He lived there from July 1958 till January 1959. He owned two bars, one located in the Plaza Hotel, and another called the Sportsman's Club on Henio Street, which he purchased in 1958.

At some point he made the acquaintance of Jack Ruby. The Warren Commission described Matthews as a "passing acquaintance" of Ruby's. Later Matthews' relationship with Ruby was examined in more detail during the tenure of the House Select Committee on Assassinations in the latter 1970s. He testified before the committee on 3 April 1978 in the presence of his lawyer Harry E. Claiborne. Matthews later told author Doug J. Swanson that "They said Ruby had my phone number in his pocket, I didn't believe it" and that he knew Ruby "to speak to him on the street. That's all".

He was a close friend and associate of Benny Binion, acting as casino manager at Binion's Horseshoe Club. Matthews functioned as muscle for Binion, patrolling the casino floor armed with a gun. He was present at the hospital for the birth of Binion's daughter Becky, and the birth of her children also. On one occasion in August 2000 he got into an altercation with casino manager and poker player Bob Stupak, slapping him in the face during a disagreement over Becky Binion's management of the Horseshoe. In November 2000 he plead no contest to a misdemeanor battery, being ordered to pay a $1000 fine.

He died in 2013 aged 92.
