= Matt Tolentino =

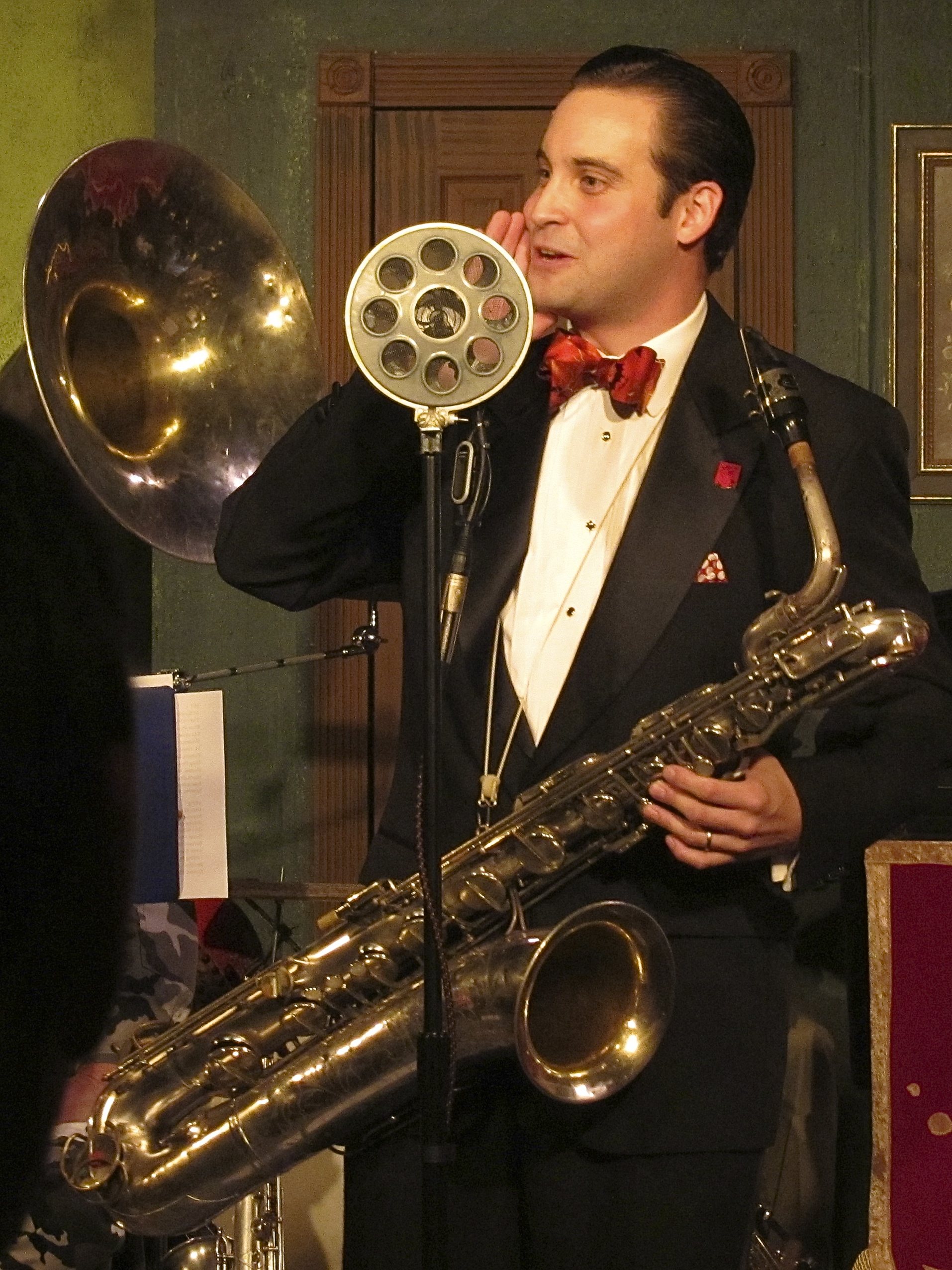

Background information
- Birth name: Matthew Antonio Tolentino
- Born: May 10, 1985 (age 39); Dallas, Texas
- Genres: Pre-swing, Jazz, Dance
- Occupation(s): Musician, Multiinstrumentalist, Singer, Bandleader
- Years active: 2007–present
- Labels: Jazzador Records
- Website: matttolentino.com

Matt Tolentino (born May 10, 1985) is a musician and bandleader specializing in the live performance and preservation of pre-swing music, with a focus on American popular songs from 1895 to 1935. Originally from Dallas, Texas, he is the leader of The Matt Tolentino Band, The New Liberty Dance Orchestra, The Royal Klobasneks polka band and The Singapore Slingers, which have been named the "Best Pre-Swing Jazz Orchestra" and the "coolest, quirkiest, retro jazz group" in Dallas, and have garnered national attention for their authenticity, including arrangements, instruments, drums, microphones, and attire of the period.

Tolentino's fascination with jazz-age music began at age 8, when a neighbor gave him a cassette tape recording of the Coffee Club Orchestra (as featured on radio's A Prairie Home Companion). He began his musical venture at 11, when he picked up the clarinet to play in the band at Stonewall Jackson Elementary. He played clarinet exclusively until he entered his sophomore year of high school, when he branched out and added saxophone, tuba and accordion. By age 16, his devotion to music was such that he asked his parents to help him buy a used accordion instead of a used car. Much of high school was spent playing polka gigs in restaurants and playing with the school jazz band. He graduated from Woodrow Wilson High School in 2003. A musical autodidact, Tolentino sings lead vocals and plays many instruments, including accordion, clarinet, tuba, bass saxophone, ukulele, banjo, piano, and vibraphone.

Today he is based in Cincinnati, Ohio and performs nationally at various festivals in the ragtime and early jazz idiom, and frequently returns to his hometown of Dallas, Texas for bigger gigs with the Singapore Slingers. His Cincinnati dance band, the New Liberty Dance Orchestra, takes its name from a 1920s dance band once popular in Cincinnati.

== Recognition ==
In early 2014, Tolentino was profiled in connection with his brainchild annual Jazz Age Sunday Social concert event at Dallas Heritage Village. A photo spread of his home and its period decor was also featured.

In late 2014, Tolentino was recognized by the Dallas Observer as number 42 among the 100 most creative people in Dallas.

== Discography ==
- When Summer Is Gone (CD) (pre-swing music recorded by The Singapore Slingers, Jazzador Records) (2010)
- Midnight, The Stars, And You (CD) (Matt Tolentino solo project, Jazzador Records) (2011)
- The Frank Skinner Project (CD) (pre-swing music recorded by The Singapore Slingers, Jazzador Records) (2014)
- Here We Go! (CD) (polka music recorded by The Royal Klobasneks, Jazzador Records) (2016)
- Light My Way To Love (CD) (pre-swing music recorded by The Singapore Slingers, Rivermont Records) (2020)
- Matt Tolentino: Accordion Band (CD) (folk music, Music Publishers of America) (2021)
