= Mockingbird Elementary School (Dallas) =

School in Dallas, Texas, United States

Coordinates: 32°50′10″N 96°46′0″W

Mockingbird Elementary School, formerly known as Stonewall Jackson Elementary School, is a public elementary school located in the Lower Greenville neighborhood, in East Dallas, Dallas, Texas. It is operated by the Dallas Independent School District (DISD). The current principal is Laura Flynn.

The school, in addition to Lower Greenville, also serves Greenland Hills (the "M Streets"), and is in proximity to it, as well as serving Caruth Terrace, Wilshire Heights, and portions of Lakewood Heights, Its campus has a capacity of about 400 students.

Mockingbird is one campus housing Dallas ISD's deaf program for elementary school. In 1998-1999 the school was designated as a National Blue Ribbon School, and it won other academic achievement awards. In 2011 The Dallas Morning News wrote that Stonewall Jackson had "long been a selling point for families interested in moving to Dallas." In 2015 Tawnell D. Hobbs and Holly K. Hacker, of the same publication, described the school as "one of the desired campuses."

== History ==
Stonewall Jackson Elementary School opened on September 13, 1939. According to then DISD superintendent Norman R. Crozier, it was named after Jackson so the school's name would match that of Robert E. Lee Elementary School (now Geneva Heights Elementary School), and because the people establishing the school supported Lee's values. The DISD school board purchased the site from W. W. Caruth for $11,250. On the 9-acre (3.6 ha) site, a building designed by C. H. Griesenbeck was built. It included a 400-seat auditorium, eleven classrooms, and a dining facility. The building, made as a one-story structure, was set up so the district could add another at a later point, and the contracts to build it were valued at a sum of $104,150. A Public Works Administration (PWA) grant of $62,100 partially funded the school. The district planned to start construction prior to January 1, 1939, with construction to finish before the fall of that year.

It was originally reserved for white students. DISD desegregated by 1970.

Olivia Henderson began serving as principal circa 1991. In 2005 DISD designated Henderson as its "principal of the year". Matthew Haag of The Dallas Morning News wrote "Under Henderson's leadership, Jackson received numerous honors."

In previous periods it had about 100 districtwide deaf students and 100 zoned families, but by 2007 the school's popularity among neighborhood parents increased. In 2011 enrollment was approximately 520, and that figure increased to 602 in 2014. The school in 2015 had fifteen portable classrooms, as its utilization was 155%. Due to the situation, in 2012 some parents opposed a rezoning proposal to expand an area apartment complex as they feared it would make overcrowding even worse and make the district change attendance boundaries. 2015 DISD approved a bridge plan that earmarked $5.3 million for expansion of Stonewall Jackson.

Henderson retired in 2013.

The school was renamed effective July 1, 2018, as the former namesake was a general in the Confederate States of America during the U.S. Civil War. The impetus for the renaming was the Charlottesville car attack that occurred the previous year in the backdrop of the Unite the Right rally. All nine DISD board members agreed to the renaming. The school community was to choose a new name, and it was required to be substantially different from the previous one. There were fifty proposals submitted, including one with Henderson's name; in December 2017 the community selected the current name, based on the school's Mockingbird Street location. By June 2018 the new signage was installed.

== Campus ==
Mockingbird Elementary consists of a main building and several portable classrooms. An addition to the main building was added and was finished in 2018. The main building consists of two floors with classrooms on each level. There is an auditorium where theater class and school plays are held, and a lunchroom on the first floor as well as a kindergarten hall. There are also multiple restrooms on each of the floors with each of the classrooms in the kindergarten hall having one. Outside of the school there are two main playground areas with the smaller one revised in 2021. Near the garden, there is a soccer field. Near the playground, there is a basketball court to accompany the field. Near that there is a white top that has an entrance to the gymnasium.

== Deaf education ==
It became one of the schools with a component of the Dallas Regional School for the Deaf in 1968. The institution, also known as the Dallas County-Wide Day School for the Deaf, had three other campuses in 1976. The school's deaf curriculum shifted to the total communication approach from the oral communication approach around 1972, and as a result the institution modified its approach to hearing aids. In 1976 the school served elementary and middle school levels and had a total of about 140 deaf students. In 1999 the majority of deaf DISD students attended Stonewall Jackson. By 1999, 17% of the students were classified as special education, and they were placed in classrooms with regular students as an effort to mainstream their education. In previous periods the number of deaf students, about 100, made up half of the school's enrollment. The numbers of deaf students declined as other DISD schools opened their own programs for the deaf. In 2011 the school had about 40 deaf students, the largest number enrolled at the time in a single DISD elementary school. In 2018 the school had 30 deaf students.

The school, as of 2005, gave American Sign Language (ASL) instruction to all students. In addition most employees, including the principal and all teachers, also had knowledge of ASL. To foster inclusiveness the school intentionally exposed all of its students to deaf culture. In 2018 former teachers reported that due to the increasing importance of meeting Texas state accountability goals, the school no longer gave all of its students ASL instruction.

== Academic performance ==
The Dallas Morning News in 2011 wrote that "Families have long been attracted to Stonewall Jackson Elementary School for its high state ratings and a reputation on par with private schools in the area." Haag stated in 2013 that "Parents have lauded Stonewall, [...] as a campus on par with a private school."

Redbook ranked Jackson as an entry in "America's Best Schools" in 1993. Principles and Methods of Adapted Physical Education and Recreation (2005 edition) states that the "unique and exceptional efforts in educating all children" enrolled resulted in the school receiving the Blue Ribbon Award, for the 1998–1999 school year.

Henderson stated that parental involvement was a significant factor in its academic performance. Due to the school's reputation, area parents are perennially opposed to changing the attendance boundary of the school; circa 2004 there was a proposal to rezone parts of the Stonewall Jackson zone to Robert E. Lee, an underutilized school which did not have the same reputation that Stonewall Jackson had; area parents campaigned to instead build portable buildings on the campus of Stonewall Jackson to accommodate more students. In 2014 Keri Mitchell of Advocate Lakewood/East Dallas stated that various parents in the R. E. Lee zone had their children sent to Stonewall Jackson, but by that year the latter school had reached capacity.

From 2008 until 2010 the Texas Education Agency (TEA) ranked the school as "exemplary" in its school accountability ratings. In 2011 the TEA began counting the performances of the at-the-time 40 deaf students, who were not previously counted, causing that year's ranking to be "acceptable"; this prompted fears of prospective parents choosing not to enroll their children and a decline in property values.

== Demographics ==
While 87% of the students in DISD in 2010 were considered to be of low socioeconomic status, that year 30% of Stonewall Jackson students were of low socioeconomic status. In 2011 The Dallas Morning News stated that the campus "has become a destination for more affluent families who have a choice about where they send their children." In 2014 the school had 602 students with 23% being classified as low income; 58% of them were non-Hispanic white.

== Culture ==
When the school had its former name, it was referred to in shorthand as "Stonewall".

In 1996, the second grade class of Evelyn Painter began a garden, and her husband Mark Painter volunteered to help have it planted. Other teachers began to involve their classes in it. By 2002 the garden had 23,000 square feet (2,100 m^{2}) of area and included a beehive, a wildflower area, and an area for growing vegetables. Mark Painter became employed by Stonewall Jackson after initially volunteering at the site. In 2007–2008, after Mark Painter was laid off due to DISD budget cuts, parents started a campaign called Stonewall Gardens to generate funding so the school could employ him again, and it did. Mark Painter retired in 2014.

== Feeder patterns ==
Residents of the Mockingbird zone are also zoned to: J. L. Long Middle School (6-8), and Woodrow Wilson High School (9-12).
