= Irwin Weiner =

American mobster and trade unionist

- Born: 6 March 1916; West Side, Chicago
- Died: 1996 (aged 79–80)
- Occupations: Union official, mobster
- Allegiance: Teamsters, Chicago Outfit

Irwin Weiner (6 March 1916 – 1996) was a mobster affiliated with the Chicago Outfit and a close associate of Jimmy Hoffa.

== Biography ==
He was born on 6 March 1916 to Leon Weiner in the West Side of Chicago. His father was a bookmaker that was murdered.

In 1951 Weiner was arrested for illegal bookmaking, receiving a $1200 fine and two years probation. He ran American Bonding Co. situated beside the police headquarters. For a short while around 1962 or 1963, Tony Spilotro worked for the company. Weiner put up the $100,000 bail for Murray Humphreys in 1965. He would also post bail for the underlings of Joseph Lombardo, James Torello, and Felix Alderisio. Weiner knew Lombardo when he was a young man and for a period Lombardo functioned as his errand boy.

In 1964, Weiner and Felix Alderisio were tried but later acquitted for extorting a Miami businessman. Weiner and Alderisio were particularly close as Weiner had known him since he was 13. In 1967 they became partners in the International Fiberglass Company. After a few years he sold his interests in the company to Spilotro, Lombardo, and Frank Schweihs. Additionally, he was an associate in three meat shortening companies of Alderisio and Albert Frabotta. Sam Battaglia and Marshall Caifano were on their payroll.

Weiner knew Santo Trafficante Jr., whom he visited in Cuba and Florida. Trafficante gave him interests in his casinos in Cuba, namely the Hotel Deauville and Hotel Capri casinos. Talk of the profits lost to Fidel Castro, who had kicked the mafia out of Cuba, reportedly brought Weiner to tears. Weiner denied having any casino interests in Cuba, but admitted making several trips to the island, which he said were purely recreational.

Weiner was close to Jimmy Hoffa, president of the International Brotherhood of Teamsters. A 1963 FBI report states that Weiner and his associate Sol Schwartz received up to $1 million for negotiating Teamsters bonds. Weiner stated that he received compensation in the sum of several hundred thousand for writing a Teamsters bond in the latter 1950s. In 1974 he was indicted for involvement in a $14 million Teamsters pension fund fraud. Others indicted were Allen Dorfman, Anthony Spilotro, and Joseph Lombardo. He was represented by Albert E. Jenner. They were all acquitted after the main government witness was murdered. Weiner stated "My attorney, Albert Jenner, was concerned about the fact that a government witness in the trial had been killed, but I told him that we were innocent men and had nothing to do with it. He believed me". His friend and co-defendant Allen Dorfman defended Weiner from accusations that he was involved with organized crime, "I've known Irv Weiner all my life and if he is organized crime, then I'm the pope".

Weiner was present when Allen Dorfman was murdered on 20 January 1983. Dorfman was shot seven times but Weiner was uninjured. Dorfman was ambushed as he and Weiner left the First National Bank of Lincolnwood on their way to lunch. They pulled into the parking lot and got out when Dorfman was shot. Weiner was never threatened by the gunman and was questioned for several hours after the shooting. It is believed that Weiner had set Dorfman up.

=== Las Vegas Skim ===
By 1971, the FBI had intelligence that Weiner was handling the skim from Las Vegas to Chicago. While Tony Spilotro was the enforcer, Weiner handled the actual money and delivered it to the Midwest.

=== Jack Ruby ===
On 26 October 1963 Weiner received a call from Jack Ruby. This 12-minute phone call is the only documented contact between the two men. After Ruby killed Lee Harvey Oswald, Weiner was asked about the contents of this call by the FBI, but he refused to discuss it. The only mention of Weiner in the Warren Report, published by the Warren Commission which was investigating the assassination of President Kennedy, is in a list of Ruby's telephone calls. Ruby was not questioned about the call, nor was Weiner who was not requested to testify at all before the commission. In the 1970s the House Select Committee on Assassinations faulted the commission for this, describing it as an omission "consistent with the Commission's overall failure to investigate possible organized crime connections.

In May 1978 Weiner was deposed before the committee. He stated that the reason he had refused to discuss the contents of the call with the FBI, was because an FBI agent who phoned his house was rude to his daughter. Speaking to the journalist Dan E. Moldea in the 1970s, he referred to Ruby as "a friend of mine", adding that his brother Earl Ruby was one of his close friends, and they had known each other from school. When Weiner was asked by the committee about this, he stated that he frequently lied to journalists and made reference to the fact that he was not under oath then, but was now.
