= University Meadows, Dallas =

Human settlement in Dallas, Texas, USA

Coordinates: 32.847°N 96.757°W

University Meadows is a residential neighborhood in eastern Dallas, Texas (USA). It is adjacent to several East Dallas neighborhoods including: Ridgewood Park and Caruth Terrace.

University Meadows is bounded by Abrams Street to the east, Lovers Lane to the north, Skillman Street to the west, and the Dallas Area Rapid Transit (DART) light rail Blue Line to the south.
