= Malcolm Wallace =

American economist and murderer

Malcolm Everett Wallace
- Born: October 15, 1921; Mount Pleasant, Texas, U.S.
- Died: January 7, 1971 (aged 49); Pittsburg, Texas, U.S.
- Resting place: Nevills Chapel Cemetery, Mount Pleasant, Texas
- Education: University of Texas at Austin
- Known for: Alleged participation in the assassination of President John F. Kennedy.
- Spouses: Mary Andre Dubose Barton; Virginia Ledgerwood
- Children: one son, two daughters

Malcolm Everett "Mac" Wallace (October 15, 1921 – January 7, 1971) was an American economist for the United States Department of Agriculture. On October 22, 1951, Wallace fatally shot John Douglas Kinser in the clubhouse of an Austin golf course owned by Kinser. A number of authors claim Wallace was involved in a conspiracy to assassinate President John F. Kennedy upon orders from then-Vice President Lyndon B. Johnson.

== Early life ==
Wallace was a native of Mount Pleasant, Texas. He was the son of Alvin James Wallace Sr. (1895–1973), a cement and construction contractor, according to the 1930 US Census, and Alice Marie Riddle (1897–1959). Wallace attended Woodrow Wilson High School in Dallas, graduating in 1939. One of his classmates was R. D. Matthews. After high school, he enlisted in the United States Marine Corps in November 1939. While in the Marine Corps, he was assigned to the USS Lexington, but was discharged on September 25, 1940, after reinjuring his back.

After his discharge from the Marine Corps, he attended the University of Texas at Austin where he was a member of the Tejas Club, Texas Cowboys, and the president of the student body. He led a 1944 protest against the ouster of UT president Homer P. Rainey and graduated in 1947. Wallace was also a student in the Graduate School of Arts and Sciences, Columbia University, from September 1947 to May 1948 but did not graduate with a degree. By early August 1951, Wallace was working as an economist with the U.S. Department of Agriculture in Washington, D.C. while his wife, a draftsman with the Planning Survey Division Texas Department of Transportation, and children lived with his mother in Austin. A contemporary account in The Daily Texan reported that Wallace had been separated from his wife, Andre, since August 3. In October 1951, Wallace was visiting Austin and Dallas while on vacation from his position in Washington.

== Murder of John Douglas Kinser ==
On October 22, 1951, in Austin, John Douglas Kinser, a 33-year-old sophomore student at the University of Texas who was having an affair with Wallace's estranged wife, was shot to death in the clubhouse of the Pitch and Putt Golf Course that he operated. Immediately after the first shot, one golfer outside the clubhouse observed a man inside holding a revolver. He heard two or three additional shots after leaving to attract the attention of three other golfers on the course. The three golfers on the course observed the man running from the clubhouse and getting into his car, and one of them noted the car's make and license plate number. The men ran to the clubhouse where they found Kinser's body, then telephoned the police who radioed the car's description and license information to state and city patrol cars. Three patrolmen with the Texas Highway Patrol spotted then stopped the car nine miles from Austin on the Burnet Highway. According to one of the patrolmen, the driver perfectly fit the description provided by the golfers and his shirt was torn and bloodied. The suspect and witness were taken to the headquarters of the Austin Police Department for questioning.

Wallace was identified as the man leaving the scene with a snubnosed pistol, and three bullet shells were found near Kinser's body. He was arrested by highway patrolmen on the Burnet Highway shortly after the shooting. Detectives revealed no motive in the killing as Wallace refused to answer their questions. He was charged the following day with murder and the Justice of the peace set bail at $30,000.

Two days after the killing, the district attorney accused the local sheriff of "obstructing the investigation" stating that he had refused to transport Wallace to the Texas Department of Public Safety for identification testing. According to the sheriff, Wallace protested the move and his defense attorney, Polk Shelton, had asked that Wallace not be moved. Wallace was represented at the trial by John Cofer, longtime lawyer to Lyndon Johnson, who had also represented LBJ during his contested election to the United States Senate in 1948 that was tainted by allegations of voter fraud.

During the trial, FBI special agent Joseph L. Schott stated that he had known Wallace for 12 years and in 1946 had given Wallace a German-made 6.35 mm Schmeisser automatic pistol that he (Schott) had acquired while serving in the United States Army in Germany. A firearms expert for the Department of Public Safety testified that the slugs and shells from the murder scene could have been fired from the Schmeisser. A chemist/toxicology expert, also with the Department of Public Safety, said that a paraffin test on Wallace's hands tested positive for gunshot residue and that blood on his shirt matched blood found at the club house at the golf course.

Testimony was completed on February 25, 1952, and Judge Charles O' Betts recessed court in order to finalize the jury instructions prior to closing arguments. The prosecution did not attempt to establish a motive for the shooting, nor did it produce an eyewitness to it or the murder weapon. The following day, the prosecution and defense completed their closing arguments and the jury was charged that afternoon. (Note: The Daily Texan wrote: "The jury can acquit Wallace or render a verdict of from two to five years—or death. If it renders from two to five years, then it can also suspend the sentence, but if the verdict is over five years it cannot suspend the sentence.") After deliberating into the evening, the jury was sequestered within the courthouse dormitory. After listening to 29.5 hours of testimony from 23 different witnesses, on February 27 the jury returned its verdict finding Wallace guilty of "murder with malice". After a short recess, O' Betts sentenced Wallace to a five-year sentence that was suspended. Questioned as to why the prosecution did not attempt to provide a motive, defense attorney Polk Shelton stated that they were not required to establish a motive but it was "probably because they couldn't."

== Later life ==
Wallace was the manager of the purchasing department of Ling-Temco-Vought. He attended an Episcopal church in Dallas.

On January 7, 1971, Wallace died when his car ran off the road 3.5 miles south of Pittsburg, Texas on U.S. Route 271. Noting that the highway was neither icy nor wet, the investigating patrolman stated that Wallace had struck a bridge abutment after apparently losing control of his car. He was buried in the Nevills Chapel Cemetery in Mount Pleasant.

== Posthumous allegations ==
In 1984, Billie Sol Estes told a grand jury investigating the 1961 shooting death of Henry Marshall, an official with the Department of Agriculture, that Wallace was his murderer. Estes, a long-time conman who served two prison terms for his crimes, said that Marshall possessed information linking Estes's fraudulent schemes to a heavily funded political slush fund run by Lyndon B. Johnson. According to Estes, he and Johnson discussed the need to stop Marshall from making their illegal ties public. In exchange for immunity from prosecution, Estes was also prepared to provide the United States Department of Justice information of eight killings orchestrated by Johnson, including the assassination of John F. Kennedy. He claimed that Wallace persuaded Jack Ruby to recruit Lee Harvey Oswald and that Wallace fired a shot that struck Kennedy.

Glen Sample and Mark Collom implicated Wallace in a conspiracy to assassinate Kennedy in their mid-1990s book The Men on the Sixth Floor. According to the authors, Collom met Loy Factor while confined in a hospital isolation ward in 1971 where Factor implicated himself, Wallace, and a woman named "Ruth Ann" in the assassination of Kennedy. Conspiracy debunker Dave Perry charged the authors of relying upon unreliable witnesses, including Factor, Estes, and Madeleine Duncan Brown.

Barr McClellan, author of Blood, Money & Power: How LBJ Killed JFK, reiterated many of Estes's claims in 2003 stating that Johnson, Wallace, Estes, and Cliff Carter were responsible for the death of Marshall. According to McClellan, Wallace fired one shot at Kennedy from the sixth floor of the Texas School Book Depository, then ran and escaped. He stated that fingerprints and an eyewitness placed Wallace in that location and that Wallace could be seen as a "shadowy figure" in photos of the building. However Wallace's fingerprints were never mentioned by the Dallas PD to have been found near or around Oswald's snipers Nest. In their 2003 obituary of Estes, The New York Times wrote that none of Estes's claims against LBJ were backed by evidence.

Roger Stone, author of the 2013 book The Man Who Killed Kennedy: The Case Against LBJ, called Wallace "Lyndon Johnson's personal hit man" and also said that Wallace shot Kennedy from the sixth floor of the Texas School Book Depository. Similar to McClellan's account, Stone said six eyewitnesses placed Wallace in that location and that a fingerprint found on a box in the sniper's nest was his.

Describing Wallace as Johnson's "hatchet man", Joan Mellen's 2017 book Faustian Bargains: Lyndon Johnson and Mac Wallace in the Robber Baron Culture of Texas also suggests that Wallace killed Marshall upon the behest of Johnson.
