= Wilshire Heights, Dallas =

Neighborhood of Dallas, Texas, USA

Wilshire Heights
- Neighborhood
- Interactive map of Wilshire Heights
- Coordinates: 32°50′0.44″N 96°45′21.52″W
- Country: United States of America
- State: Texas
- County: Dallas County
- City: Dallas
- Time zone: UTC-6:00 (CST)
  - Summer (DST): UTC-5:00 (CDT)
- Website: wilshireheights.org

Wilshire Heights is a residential neighborhood in eastern Dallas, Texas (USA). It is adjacent to several East Dallas neighborhoods including: Lakewood, Stonewall Terrace, Lakewood Heights, and Caruth Terrace.

Wilshire Heights is bound by Abrams Street to the east, East Mockingbird Lane to the north, Skillman Street to the west, and Mercedes Avenue to the south.

== Education ==
It is within the Dallas Independent School District. Residents are zoned to: Mockingbird Elementary School, J.L. Long Middle School, and Woodrow Wilson High School.

The Roman Catholic Diocese of Dallas operates St. Thomas Aquinas Catholic School, a K-8 school in the area. It has separate facilities for grades Pre-Kindergarten through 2 (lower school) and grades 3-8 (upper school): the upper school is in Wilshire Heights, while the lower school is in Caruth Terrace. In 2011 the church took possession of 2.68 acres (1.08 ha) of land adjacent to the upper school.
