= Rivermont Records =

American independent record label

- Founded: 2003
- Founder: Bryan S. Wright
- Distributor: City Hall Records
- Genre: Ragtime, jazz, hot dance
- Country of origin: U.S.
- Location: Lynchburg, Virginia
- Official website: rivermontrecords.com

Rivermont Records is an independent American record label that specializes in ragtime, jazz, and hot dance music. The company issues recordings of contemporary ragtime pianists and traditional jazz orchestras, and reissues rare vintage recordings of dance bands from the 1910-1930 era. The label's issues include 78 RPM vinyl in the microgroove format which are playable with a contemporary turntable and stylus. Rivermont was founded in Lynchburg, Virginia in 2003 by pianist and musicologist Bryan S. Wright. The label is distributed in the United States by City Hall Records. Rivermont has been nominated for a Grammy Award for Best Album Notes three times: in 2010, 2018 and 2021.

== Artists ==
- Jacob Adams
- American Ragtime Ensemble (David Reffkin, dir.)
- Arcadia Dance Orchestra
- Paul Asaro
- Brahmin Bellhops
- Bridgetown Sextet
- Chicago Cellar Boys
- Ed Clute
- Kim Cusack
- Kenny Davern
- Matthew de Lacey Davidson
- Richard Dowling
- The Fat Babies
- The Fried Seven
- Vince Giordano and The Nighthawks
- The Graystone Monarchs (Josh Duffee, dir.)
- Alex Hassan
- Frederick Hodges
- Brian Holland
- Dick Hyman
- Charlie Judkins and Miss Maybell
- Max Keenlyside
- Dan Levinson
- Carl Sonny Leyland
- The Lovestruck Balladeers
- Domingo Mancuello
- Royce Martin
- William McNally
- Alex Mendham and His Orchestra
- T. J. Muller
- Roya Naldi
- New Orleans Night Owls (Hal Smith, dir.)
- Andrew Nolte and His Orchestra
- Andrew Oliver
- Original Cornell Syncopators
- Peacherine Ragtime Society Orchestra (Andrew Greene, dir.)
- Will Perkins
- The Ragabonds
- Dalton Ridenhour
- Tom Roberts
- Andy Schumm
- The Singapore Slingers (Matt Tolentino, dir.)
- Sónico
- Martin Spitznagel
- Dániel Szabó
- Three for a Song
- 'Cile Turner
- Ethan Uslan
- West End Jazz Band
- Ian Whitcomb
- Bryan Wright
- Vanessa Tagliabue Yorke

== See also ==
- List of record labels
