= John Martino (writer) =

American casino security systems technician (1911–1975)

John Vincent Martino
- Born: John Martino; August 3, 1911; Atlantic City, New Jersey, U.S.
- Died: August 3, 1975 (aged 64); Miami Beach, Florida, U.S.
- Occupation: Casino security systems technician

John V. Martino (Atlantic City, 3 August 1911 – Miami Beach, 3 August 1975) was an American casino security systems technician who spent 40 months in jail in Havana and published the book I Was Castro's Prisoner (1963), ghostwritten by Nathaniel Weyl.

== Biography ==
=== Cuba ===
Martino installed the gambling machines in the casino at Santo Trafficante Jr.'s Hotel Deauville, which were rigged to favor the mob. He was arrested in 1959 on charges of smuggling Cuban citizens after he had attempted to smuggle out of Cuba the family of the former Batista official Esteban Ventura Novo. He received a 13-year sentence. His 16-year-old son was also held at the same time but released after four days. Martino was imprisoned at Isle of Pines, El Principe, and La Cabaña prisons along with thousands of Cuban dissidents and many Americans. According to Martino his "principal mission" in travelling to Cuba was to "liberate gambling cash left behind by Trafficante". At La Cabaña he shared a cell with the former Minister of Agriculture Humberto Sorí Marin, later to be executed. His release and return to Miami in October 1962 gained him some status among anti-Castro exiles.

=== Post-release ===
Following his release from prison Martino returned to the United States where he became an anti-Castro public speaker and involved himself in the movement to overthrow Castro. In Miami he became a roommate of Frank Sturgis, later known for his involvement in the Watergate scandal. Martino also knew the gangster Johnny Roselli, they lived together in a motel at Key Biscayne, Florida. In 1963 he was involved in organizing Cuban exile boat raids along the coast of Cuba. These schemes were organized by Eddie Bayo and William Pawley. In October of that year he delivered a lecture organized by Freedom Forum on his experiences while imprisoned in Cuba.

In 1994 Martino's wife Flo claimed to journalist Anthony Summers that Martino had advance knowledge of the assassination of John F. Kennedy. She said that Martino had told her "Flo, they’re going to kill him. They’re going to kill him when he gets to Texas" and that he had received non-stop calls from Texas. According to Martino's son Edward, his father had travelled to Dallas twice in Autumn 1963 and on the day of Kennedy's assassination was ordered to stay home from school and monitor the news. When he informed his father that Kennedy had been shot, he was reportedly unsurprised. Martino himself claimed to have been involved at a low-level in the assassination in a plot orchestrated by the Cuban exiles, the mafia, and the CIA. He is reported to have told friends that Oswald was manipulated so as to trigger an American invasion of Cuba.

After the assassination Martino approached the Warren Commission, set up by President Lyndon B. Johnson to investigate, to tell them that he possessed information indicating Castro was responsible. He claimed his source was an official "high in the Cuban government". This claim was dismissed by the commission and he was referred to the FBI, who decided not to pursue the lead.
