= Hotel Capri =

High rise hotel in Havana, Cuba

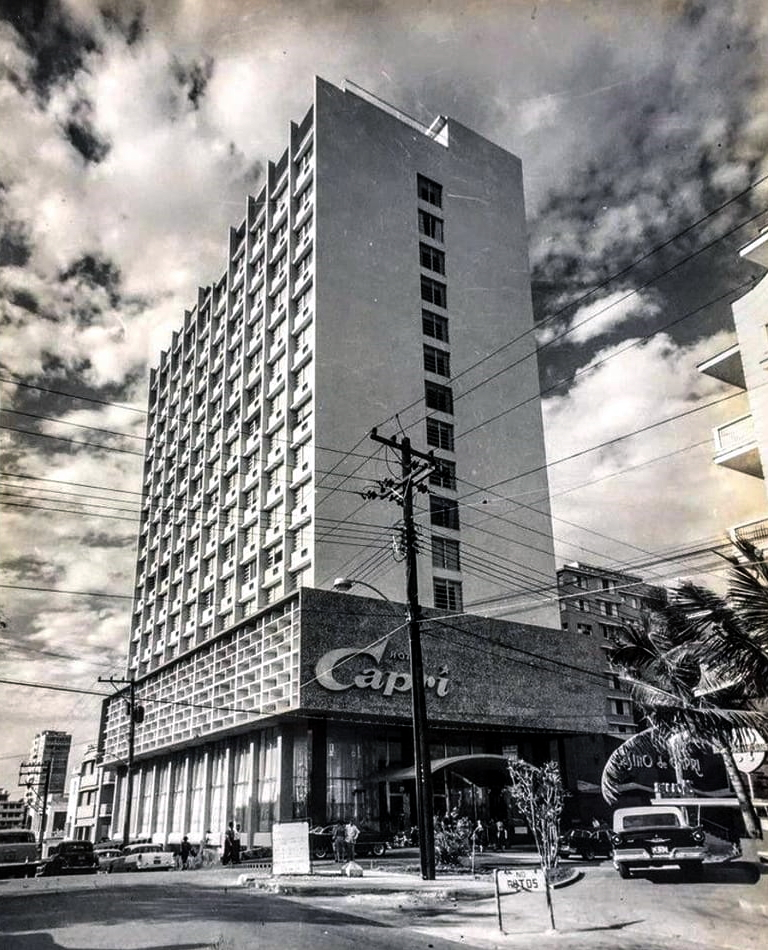
- Hotel Capri, circa 1958

General information
- Location: Calle 21 / Calle N, Vedado, Havana
- Coordinates: 23°8′31.96″N 82°22′57.35″W
- Opening: November 27, 1957 (original), 2014 (reopened)
- Owner: Cuban government

Technical details
- Floor count: 19

Design and construction
- Architect: Jose Canaves

Other information
- Number of rooms: 220

The Hotel Capri is a historic high rise hotel located in central Havana, Cuba.

== History ==
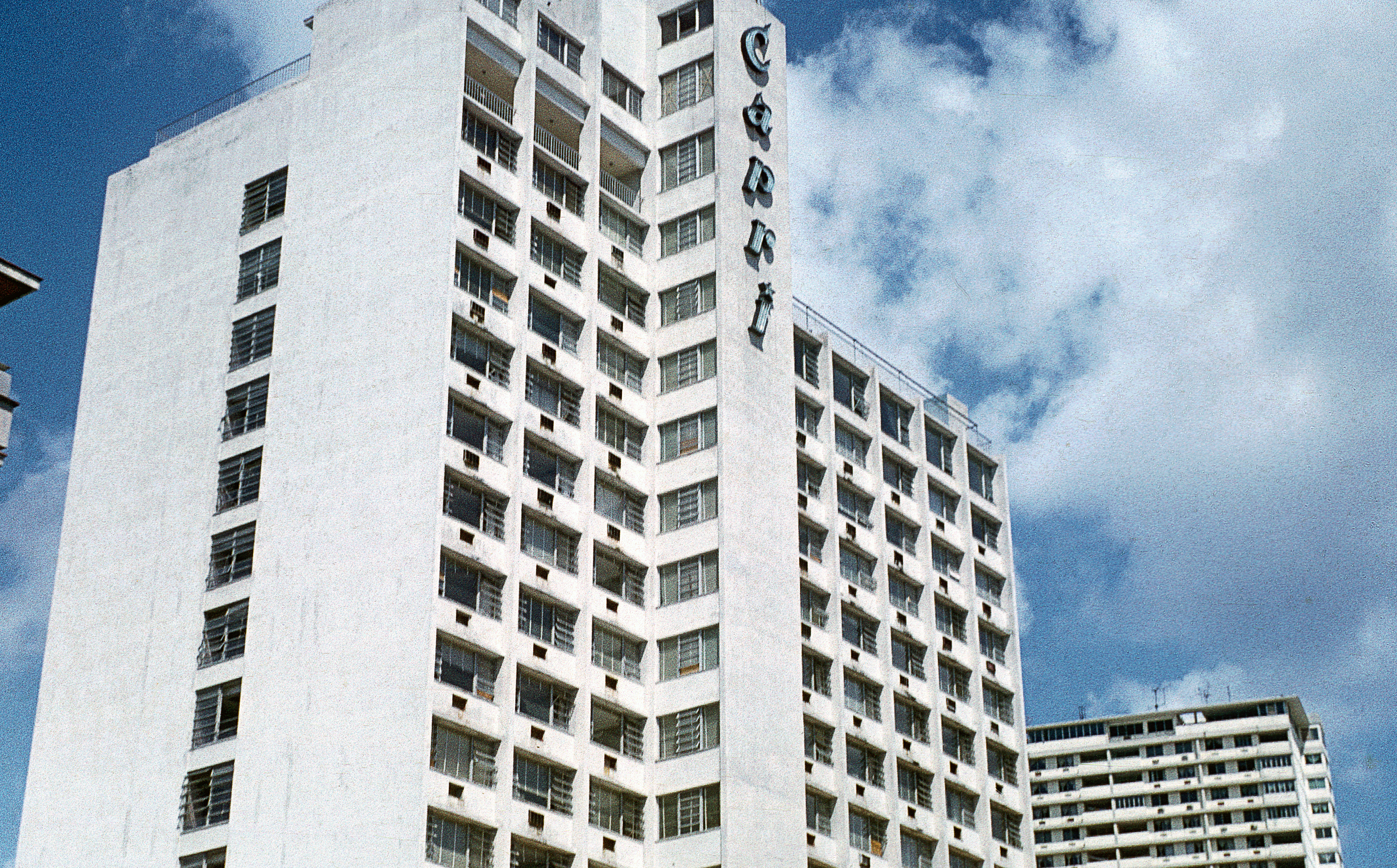
Hotel Capri in 1973.

In 1955, President Batista enacted Hotel Law 2074, offering tax incentives, government loans, and casino licenses to anyone wishing to build hotels in excess of $1,000,000 or nightclubs for $200,000 in Havana. This law brought Meyer Lansky and his "associates" in the mafia flooding to the city to take advantage.

The Hotel Capri de Havana was one of the first mob hotels to be built. Located on Calle 21, 1 Mp. 8 Vedado, only two blocks from the Hotel Nacional, it opened in November 1957. With its 250 rooms, the nineteen-story structure was one of the largest hotel/casinos in Havana during its heyday. It boasted a swimming pool on the roof.

The hotel opened on November 27, 1957, with its opening ceremony being attended by officials of the Batista government. Owned by mobster Santo Trafficante, Jr. of Tampa, Florida, the hotel/casino was operated by Nicholas Di Costanzo, racketeer Charles Turin (aliases: Charles Tourine, Charley "The Blade"), and Santino Masselli of the Bronx NY(aliases:"Sonny the Butcher"). After it opened, George Raft was hired to be the public front for the hotel's club during his gangster days in Cuba. It was believed that he owned a considerable interest in the club. Reportedly Chicago gangster Irwin Weiner also had a share in the casino.

The hotel was designed by architect Jose Canaves and owned by the Canaves family. The hotel, along with its famous casino, was leased to American hotelier, "Skip" Shephard. The Hotel Capri was nationalized by the Cuban government in October 1960, and the casino was closed.

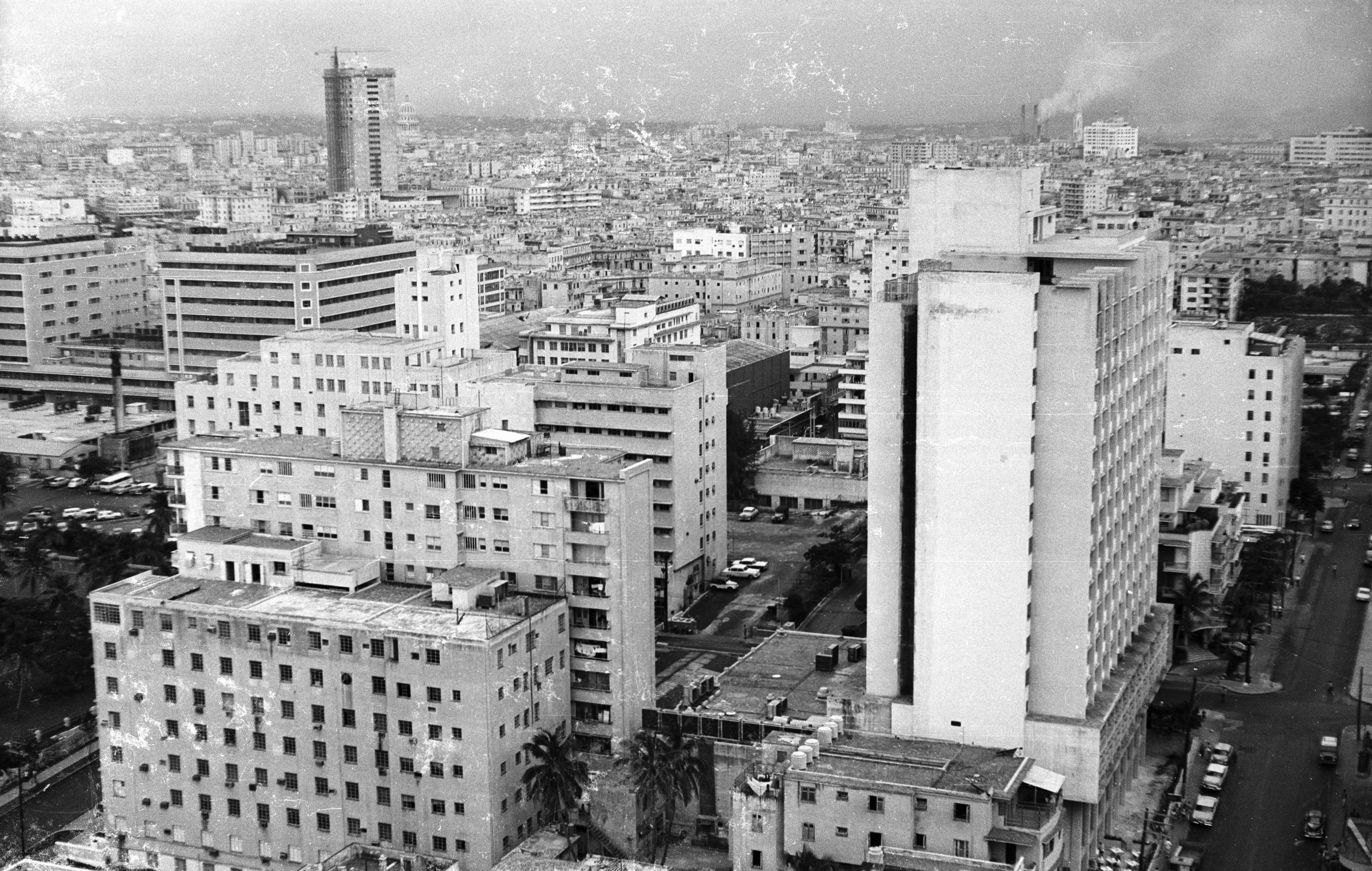
Hotel Capri in 1974.

The hotel was known as the Hotel Horizontes Capri in the 1990s, before it closed in 2003. The government ownership entity, Grupo Caribe, undertook major renovations, and the hotel reopened in January 2014, managed by the Spanish NH Hotel Group as the Hotel NH Capri La Habana. A grand opening celebration was held on May 9, 2014, with a ribbon cutting by NH Hotel Group CEO Federico Gonzalez Tejera and Cuban Vice Minister of Tourism D. Alexis Trujillo.

In 2017, the hotel was one of several sites of a suspected acoustic attack against American diplomats, described as "Havana syndrome". Reports of piercing, high-pitched noises and inexplicable ailments were investigated, but a source of the phenomenon was never definitively determined.

NH Hotels ceased managing the hotel in February 2026, due to the uncertain economic situation in Cuba amid the US blockade of the island.

== Filmography ==
- The rooftop pool can be seen in the opening scene of Mikhail Kalatozov's film "I Am Cuba".
- The main entrance and adjoining square are visible in the Soviet spy miniseries "TASS Is Authorized to Declare..." (episode 2, 55:05-55:43), based on a novel of the same name by Yulian Semyonov.
- In Francis Ford Coppola's movie The Godfather Part II, Fredo Corleone brings a suitcase containing $2 million to his brother Michael at the "Hotel Capri". The movie refers to the involvement of the American mafia in the gambling and hotel industry in Cuba during the Batista dictatorship. The film was shot in the Dominican Republic, where the Hotel El Embajador doubled for the Capri.

== Gallery ==
Hotel Capri in 2009, before renovations

== See also ==
- FOCSA Building
- Monument to the Victims of the USS Maine (Havana)
- Malecón, Havana
- Havana Plan Piloto
- Timeline of Havana
