= The Singapore Slingers =

- Origin: Dallas, Texas
- Genres: Jazz, Dance
- Years active: 2007–Present
- Labels: Jazzador, Rivermont
- Members: Matt Tolentino - bandleader Linda Proch - violin Kevin Yu - violin Jim Herrera - violin Cynthia Dashiell - viola Gretchen Nichols - cello Evan Wennerberg - flute Jon Stutler - clarinet Cassie Conway - saxophone David Lovrien - saxophone Marc Dunbar - saxophone Matt Seppeler - trumpet Phil West - trumpet Eugene LeBeaux - trombone Charlie Horwitz - string bass Irwin Arnstein - tuba Robert Edwards - piano George Gagliardi - banjo Michael Plotkin - drums/xylophone/Lord high master of percussion
- Website: The Singapore Slingers

The Singapore Slingers are an American 18-member orchestra based in Dallas, Texas that specializes in performing pre-swing American dance music, with a particular focus on popular songs of the 1920s and early 1930s. They have been called the "coolest, quirkiest, retro jazz group" in Dallas by the local press. They are the only group of their kind in Dallas, with a repertoire that regularly features fox trots, waltzes, marches, one-steps, two-steps, rags, tangos, and rumbas. The band was formed in late 2007 by Dallas native Matt Tolentino, and continues under his direction, normally consisting of four reeds, three brass, five rhythm players, and a string section including three violins, a viola, a cello, and a string bass. The Singapore Slingers were nominated in the category "Best Jazz Act" for the 2011 Dallas Observer Music Awards, and were named Best Pre-Swing Jazz Orchestra by the Dallas Observer in 2011.

The Singapore Slingers perform regularly at venues all over Dallas. Bandleader Tolentino plays many instruments, including clarinet, tuba, bass saxophone, ukulele, banjo, piano, and accordion. Much of the band's repertoire utilizes orchestrations of Tin Pan Alley tunes popularized by the likes of the Mills Brothers, Duke Ellington, the Club Royal Orchestra, Paul Whiteman, the Original Dixieland Jazz Band, Marx Brothers films, and other sources, and stays true to vintage arrangements from America's finest composers of the first three decades of the 20th century.

== Discography ==
Year	Title	Label	Number	Notes
2010	When Summer Is Gone	Jazzador		
2011	Midnight, The Stars, And You			Matt Tolentino solo project
2014	The Frank Skinner Project			
2020	Light My Way To Love	Rivermont	BSW-2257	
