= Deauville Criteria =

Medical test used to assess lymphoma

The Deauville 5-point scoring system is an internationally accepted and utilized five-point scoring system for the fluorodeoxyglucose (FDG) avidity of a Hodgkin lymphoma or Non-Hodgkin lymphoma tumor mass as seen on FDG positron emission tomography:

- Score 1: No uptake above the background
- Score 2: Uptake ≤ mediastinum
- Score 3: Uptake > mediastinum but ≤ liver
- Score 4: Uptake moderately increased compared to the liver at any site
- Score 5: Uptake markedly increased compared to the liver at any site
- Score X: New areas of uptake unlikely to be related to lymphoma

Scores of 1 and 2 are considered to be negative and 4 and 5 are considered to be positive. "Score 3 should be interpreted according to the clinical context but in many Hodgkin Lymphoma patients indicates a good prognosis with standard treatment."

== History ==
Deauville score was developed at Guy's and Saint Thomas Hospital in London after an international meeting at Deauville, France in 2009.
