= Lower Greenville, Dallas =

Neighborhood in Dallas, Texas, USA

Lower Greenville
- Neighborhood
- Interactive map of Lower Greenville
- Coordinates: 32.823502°N 96.77015°W
- Country: United States of America
- State: Texas
- County: Dallas County
- City: Dallas
- Time zone: UTC-6:00 (CST)
  - Summer (DST): UTC-5:00 (CDT)

Lower Greenville is a neighborhood in east Dallas, west of Lakewood in the United States. Specifically the neighborhood is the area adjacent to Greenville Avenue south of Mercedes Avenue and north of Belmont Avenue. The area south of Belmont Avenue is often and more specifically, called "Lowest Greenville," and the area north of Mockingbird Lane is named "Upper Greenville." "Lower Greenville" is also used to refer to the neighborhoods surrounding Greenville Avenue including Vickery Place, the Belmont Addition, Glencoe, Greenland Hills (the "M Streets"), and Stonewall Terrace. It straddles Dallas Council Districts 14 and 2.

Lower Greenville is a major entertainment district in Dallas south of Mockingbird Lane containing many popular bars, restaurants, boutique stores and live music venues.

== History ==
In the early 20th Century, Greenville Avenue was one of the most important roads in Dallas, serving the new residential areas in East Dallas and playing the part that the North Central Expressway (US 75) plays today. Before the construction of the North Central Expressway in the 1950s, Greenville Avenue was the main route from northern Dallas into downtown, with the H&TC railroad occupying the current location of North Central Expressway. In the 1910s, Goodwin Avenue was at the far north end of Greenville Avenue and served East Dallas including the Belmont addition and Vickery Place addition. In the 1920s, the Greenland Hills addition was platted North of Vickery Place, and Mockingbird Lane became the northern boundary of the city of Dallas. Prior to the mid-1920s, Greenville Avenue was known as the "Richardson Road" or the "Richardson Pike".

Before the construction of the North Central Expressway in 1950, Greenville Avenue was the main route to Richardson, Plano, McKinney and north to the states of Oklahoma and Arkansas. It is for this reason that the "Lower Greenville" area was developed as one of the most important centers in Dallas for shopping and restaurants, especially the area comprising "Lowest Greenville" in modern times. The arrival of the automobile in Dallas was via Greenville Avenue, and even today the Lower Greenville Avenue area is a hot spot for automobile and motorcycle enthusiasts. This is especially true for what is arguably the center of the Lower Greenville area, the intersection of Goodwin Ave and Greenville Ave, which has been a popular gathering spot and watering hole since at least the 1930s. The Granada Theater was built on Greenville Avenue in 1946, and was originally a movie house. Today, it is an important music venue. It has been wonderfully preserved, and still looks just like the illustration in a news story from 1946.

== Education ==
The Dallas Independent School District (DISD) operates public schools serving Lower Greenville. There are two schools in Lower Greenville: Geneva Heights Elementary School (formerly Robert E. Lee Elementary School) and Mockingbird Elementary School (formerly Stonewall Jackson Elementary School). The two schools serve separate portions of the community. At the secondary level students are zoned to J. L. Long Middle School and Woodrow Wilson High School.

Geneva Heights Elementary School was known as Robert E. Lee Elementary School but renamed on July 1, 2018 as the former namesake was a general in the Confederacy. In addition to portion of Lower Greenville it serves Vickery Place. Circa 2007 the school was known for high staff retention periods to the point where a teacher who had been at the school for fewer than ten years was considered to be a newcomer. At one time enrollment was 250, but it later got a peak enrollment of almost 600. Accommodating growth, another wing was installed by 1996. In 1996 the racial demographics of the students were: 78% Hispanic or Latino, 11% Anglo White, and 10% African-American. Enrollment declined by 2007 partly because some apartment complexes housing children were razed.

By 2007 the enrollment was about 250, 30% from outside of the school's attendance zone, with enrollment being about 45% of the building's capacity and with only the ground floor in use. There were 18 students per teacher. Holly Mullen of the Dallas Observer wrote that in comparison to Stonewall Jackson, Lee "labored in Jackson's shadow for years" and was characterized by "lower test scores and fewer parent-driven bells and whistles". Keri Mitchell of The Advocate Lakewood/East Dallas wrote that a 2007 campaign to attract more neighborhood families "fizzled". In 2012 the enrollment was 58% of the building's capacity. It was scheduled to absorb the population of the former Bonham Elementary School later that year. Mitchell wrote that the absorption of Bonham students added "engaged families" to the school community. In addition, during the principalship of Ali Saiyed, the school added a dual language program. In 2014 Lee had 362 students, with 71% being classified as low income and with about 83% being racial and ethnic minorities. At that time few parents from the single family houses in the area sent their children to the school. DISD planned to introduce the International Baccalaureate (IB) program to attract families to the school.
