= Greenland Hills, Dallas =

Neighborhood in Dallas, Texas, USA

Greenland Hills M Streets Conservation District
- Neighborhood
- Nickname: M Streets
- Location within DFW Location within Texas Location within the United States
- Coordinates: 32°49′36.31″N 96°46′40.24″W
- Country: United States
- State: Texas
- County: Dallas
- City: Dallas
- Area: North Dallas
- Time zone: UTC−6 (Central)
  - Summer (DST): UTC−5 (Central)
- ZIP Code: 75206
- Area codes: 214, 469, 972
- Website: www.mstreets.org

Greenland Hills (also known as the M Streets) is a neighborhood in East Dallas, Texas, United States. The area is also known as the M Streets due to two major streets (McCommas and Monticello) and many of the minor streets starting with the letter M. The neighborhood also forms the M Streets Conservation District.

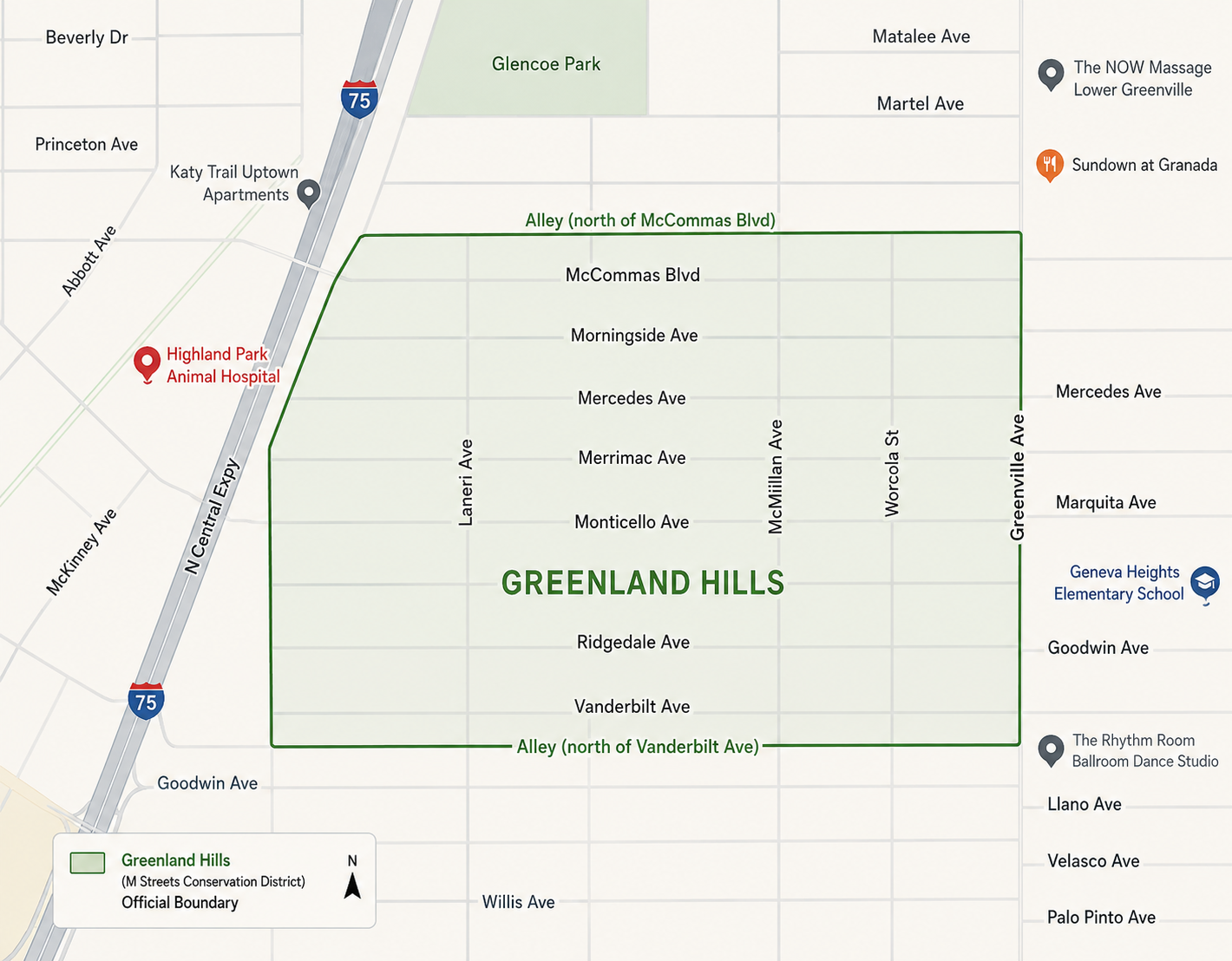

== About ==
The official legal boundary is: center line of the alley between McCommas Boulevard and Longview Street on the north, the center line of Greenville Avenue on the east, the centerline of the alley between Vanderbilt Avenue and Goodwin Avenue on the south, and the centerline of US-75 on the west, but excluding Block 2193, Lots 9 and 10 and Block H2912, Lot 8A, and containing approximately 176 acres of land.

The homes original to Greenland Hills date back to the 1920s, with most representing the Tudor architectural style. Original details, such as stained glass windows, arches, and hardwood floors have been conserved. The M streets has a population of about 6,000 people and the house owner-occupied home value ranges from $825,000 - $1,875,000

The area of the M-Streets in U.S. ZIP Code 75206 has many smaller neighborhoods, each with their own character and housing styles.

== Institutions ==
=== Public schools ===
The neighborhood is served by the Dallas Independent School District (DISD) for public schools.

Children within the neighborhood are served by:

- Mockingbird Elementary School (K-5) in Lower Greenville - It is in proximity to, but outside of, Greenland Hills.
- J. L. Long Middle School (6–8)
- Woodrow Wilson High School (9–12)

Eduardo Mata Montessori School, a K-8 school, gives second admission priority to people zoned to Woodrow Wilson High. Therefore, Junius Heights is one of the neighborhoods with priority for the school.

=== Private schools ===
Nearby private schools include: St. Thomas Aquinas Catholic School (K-8), Dallas Christian Academy (K-12), Bishop Lynch High School (9–12), and Lakehill Preparatory School (K-12).

=== Colleges and universities ===
Greenland Hills is situated 2 miles from Southern Methodist University and in the Dallas County Community College District, which offers academic, continuing education, and adult education programs through seven community colleges and 14 campuses in Dallas County.

=== Churches ===
Many houses of worship are nearby including: Ridgecrest Baptist Church, Unity Church of Christianity, Greenland Hills United Methodist Church, Skillman Church of Christ, St. Andrew's Presbyterian Church, Providence Presbyterian Church, First United Lutheran Church, Northridge Presbyterian Church, Wilshire Baptist Church, New St. Peters Presbyterian Church, Lakewood United Methodist Church, Lakewood Presbyterian Church, and St. Thomas Aquinas Catholic Church.

== Parks and recreation ==
- Glencoe Park, established in 1944, is a 14.1 acre neighborhood park managed by the Dallas Parks and Recreation Department. Features included: basketball, picnic tables, water fountain, playground portalets, rugby field, softball field, tennis court, and walking trails.
- Katy Trail
- Santa Fe Trail, beginning at White Rock Lake and winding through East Dallas neighborhoods, connects to historic Deep Elum and Fair Park by way of a 12 foot wide, 4.5 mile long paved path over the former Santa Fe Railroad line.
- White Rock Lake
