= Stonewall Terrace, Dallas =

Coordinates: 32.832°N 96.766°W

Stonewall Terrace is a residential neighborhood in eastern Dallas, Texas (USA). It is adjacent to several East Dallas neighborhoods, including Wilshire Heights, North Stonewall Terrace, Glencoe, and Lower Greenville.

Stonewall Terrace is bound by Skillman Street to the east, East Mockingbird Lane to the north, Greenville Avenue to the west, and Mercedes Avenue to the south.
