= Hotel Deauville (Manhattan) =

Former hotel in Manhattan, New York

Coordinates: 40.743895°N 73.983033°W

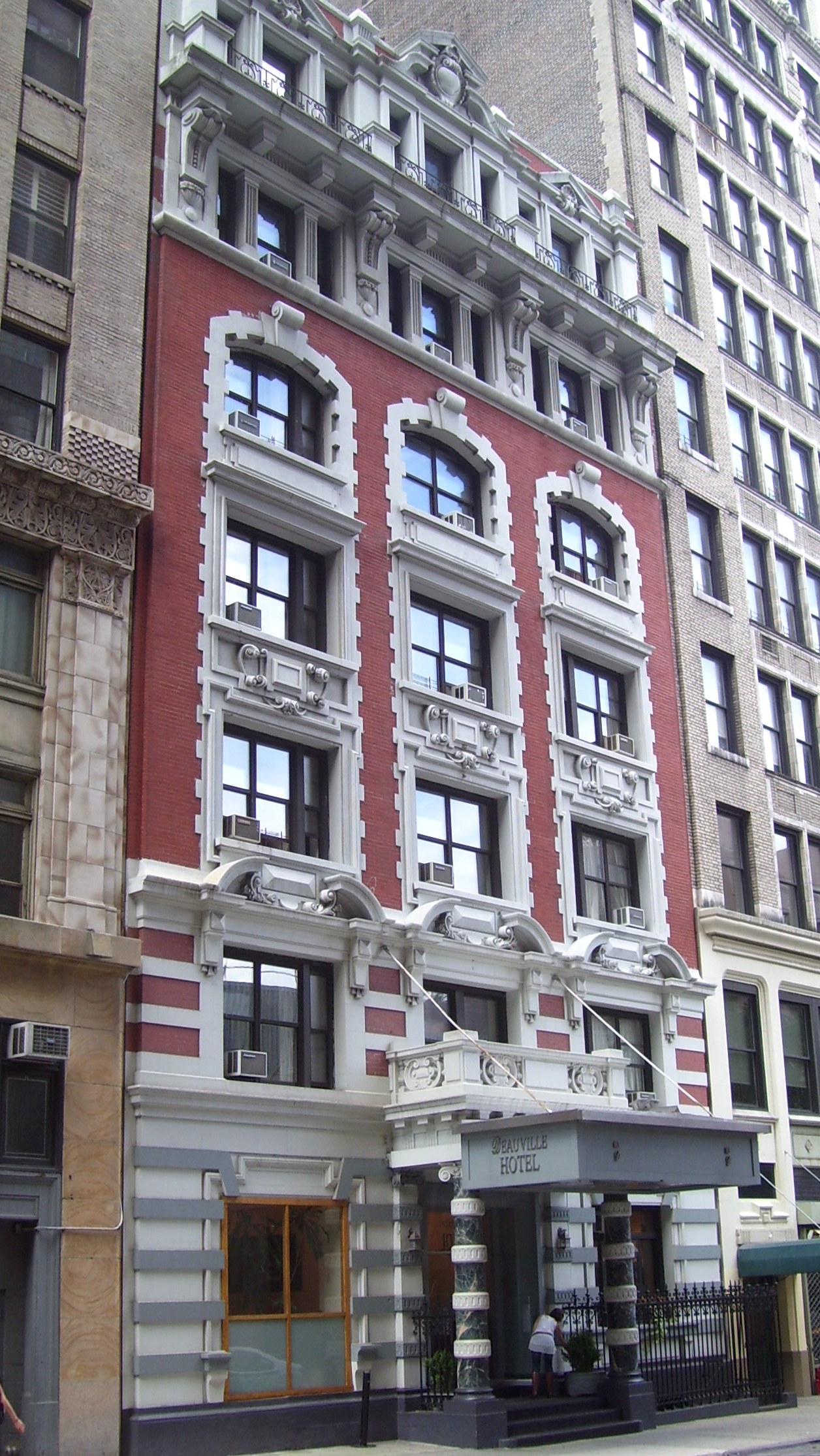
Hotel Deauville in 2012

Hotel Deauville was a hotel at 103 East 29th Street in Rose Hill, Manhattan, New York City, built in 1901. It was a seven-story brick and stone structure influenced by Beaux-Arts architecture, and was originally an apartment hotel known as Hatfield House. A modern 19-story hotel, designed by Arkan Zeytinoglu Architects and developed by Frank Savino, with 120 rooms, will replace the Hotel Deauville. Demolition of the former hotel was completed in 2023.
