= Belmont, Dallas =

Neighborhood in East Dallas, Texas, USA

Belmont
- Neighborhood
- Location within DFW Location within Texas Location within the United States
- Coordinates: 32°49′7.48″N 96°45′57.65″W
- Country: United States of America
- State: Texas
- County: Dallas County
- City: Dallas
- Time zone: UTC-6:00 (CST)
  - Summer (DST): UTC-5:00 (CDT)

Belmont is a neighborhood in East Dallas, Texas founded by Dallas pioneer and civic leader, Colonel Henry Exall. On May 1, 1890 Mr. Exall submitted the Belmont Plat Map to the City of Dallas. Belmont consisted of a 160 acres (65 ha) parcel from the original Allen Beard survey and a 10 acres (4.0 ha) parcel from the original Robert Ray Survey. The Belmont neighborhood is located near Lower Greenville. The neighborhood's boundaries are Greenville Avenue to the West, Skillman Avenue to the East. The North border is the center of LLano Ave. The South border is the center of Prospect Ave in the 5700 and 5800 blocks. It then turns South down the center of Delmar Ave to the center of Oram Ave and continues East down the Center of Oram to Skillman.

== Early history ==
Colonel Exall planned to make Belmont the most attractive residential portion of Dallas. His plans included 5-foot-wide (1.5 m) sidewalks, Macadamized streets, terraced lots. Deed restrictions required all new homes to cost at least $2,000 at the time of construction. Utilities and an artesian water well were also planned to run to each lot. However, when the panic of 1893 gripped the nation; the underdeveloped Belmont was sold at the Dallas County Courthouse on May 1, 1894, at 4 PM. The highest bidder was Adolphus Busch of St. Louis, MO. He paid $20,000 for the remaining lots. Mr. Busch had originally financed Exall for the Belmont purchase.

The lots sat vacant for more than 17 years and they became overgrown with native Bois d'Arc trees, sunflowers, and weeds. On June 23, 1911, Mr. Busch's son, and heir, August Anheuser Busch, sold and financed 478 of the original 624 lots in Belmont to the Belmont Land Company. Ben T. Seay, a Belmont Addition property owner along with Rhodes S. Baker and Jeff D. Robinson, founded the Belmont Land Company just days before they purchased the land in 1911. The Belmont Land Company launched and aggressive and creative advertising campaign that put Belmont back on the map.

== Architecture ==
Although a few of the original two-story homes and bungalows remain, the neighborhood has preserved most of its original charm and architectural styles. A combination of new and older homes in the Craftsman, Prairie, Colonial Revival, Tudors as well as other early 20th century architectural style homes, along with its mature trees and easygoing lifestyle, give this neighborhood a sense of place and time.

== Belmont Conservation District ==
In 2004, the Belmont Conservation District was formed, through the passage of a Dallas City Ordinance, with the intent of preserving the unique character of the neighborhood.
