= List of high schools in Albuquerque, New Mexico =

The following is a list of high schools in Albuquerque, New Mexico.

School name	Established	Mascot	Type of school
ABQ Charter Academy	2004		Charter
ACE Leadership High School		Charter	
Albuquerque Academy	1955	Charger	Private
Albuquerque Institute for Mathematics and Science	2005	Archer	Charter
Albuquerque High School	1879	Bulldog	Public
Albuquerque Talent Development Academy		-	Charter
Amy Biehl High School	2000	Lion	Charter
Atrisco Heritage Academy High School	2008	Jaguar	Public
Bosque School	1994	Bobcat	Private
Career Enrichment Center	1975	Stars	Magnet
Cibola High School	1976	Cougar	Public
College and Career High School	2013	-	Magnet
Corrales International School		-	Charter
Cottonwood Classical Preparatory School	2007	Coyote	Charter
Digital Arts & Technology Academy (DATA)		Dragon	Charter
Del Norte High School	1964	Knight	Public
Designs for Learning Differences (DLD) Sycamore School		Sycamore Tree	Private
El Camino Real Academy		-	Charter
Eldorado High School	1970	Golden Eagle	Public
Freedom High School		-	Magnet
Health Leadership High School		-	
Highland High School	1949	Hornet	Public
Hope Christian School	1976	Huskie	Private
La Academia de Esperanza Charter School	2003	-	Charter
La Cueva High School	1986	Bear	Public
Los Puentes Charter School	2002	-	Charter
Manzano High School	1961	Monarch	Public
Mark Armijo Charter Academy	2001	White Tiger	Charter
Menaul School	1896	Panther	Private
Native American Community Academy	2006	-	Charter
New Futures High School		Butterfly	Magnet
New Mexico Academy for the Media Arts	2008	Minotaur	Charter
Nex+Gen Academy	2010	Griffin	Magnet
Public Academy for Performing Arts	2001	Panda	Charter
Rio Grande High School	1959	Raven	Public
Robert F. Kennedy High School	2001	Cobra	Charter
St. Pius X High School	1956	Sartan	Private
Sandia High School	1958	Matador	Public
Sandia Preparatory School	1966	Sundevil	Private
School on Wheels Magnet School		-	Magnet
South Valley Academy	2000	Dragon	Charter
Southwest Secondary Learning Center		-	Charter
Technology Leadership High School	2015	Titan	Charter
Valley High School	1954	Viking	Public
Volcano Vista High School	2007	Hawk	Public
West Mesa High School	1966	Mustang	Public
