= McKinley Middle School =

McKinley Middle School may refer to:

- McKinley Middle School, Albuquerque, New Mexico; included in List of middle schools in Albuquerque
- McKinley Middle School, Flint, Michigan; operated by Flint Community Schools
- McKinley Middle School (Racine, Wisconsin)
