= Hollywood Heights =

Hollywood Heights may refer to:

== In geography ==
- Hollywood Heights, Los Angeles, a neighborhood in Los Angeles, California
- Hollywood Heights, Dallas, a neighborhood in Dallas, Texas
- Hollywood Heights, Collinsville, a neighborhood in Collinsville, Illinois

== In media and entertainment ==
- Hollywood Heights (TV series), TV drama which aired in 2012
