= ISAS (disambiguation) =

ISAS may refer to:

- International School for Advanced Studies, a post-graduate teaching and research institute in Trieste, Italy
- Institute of Space and Astronautical Science, a Japanese research institute currently part of the Japan Aerospace Exploration Agency
- Independent Schools Association of the Southwest, an association of 89 independent schools located in Arizona, Kansas, Louisiana, New Mexico, Oklahoma, and Texas.
- Ictal-Interictal SPECT Analysis by SPM, a method of localizing seizures
