= Lakewood Theater =

Lakewood Theater may refer to:

- Lakewood Theater (Madison, Maine), listed on the NRHP in Somerset County, Maine
- Lakewood Theater (Dallas, Texas)
