= Tanglewood Forest, Austin, Texas =

Neighbourhood

Coordinates: 30°10′40″N 97°50′00″W

Neighborhood map

Tanglewood Forest is a neighborhood of southern Austin, Texas that was formerly its own census-designated place in Travis County, active as of the 1990 U.S. census.

It was formerly governed from a municipal utility district. In 1997 the city of Austin announced it was annexing Tanglewood Forest.

== Education ==
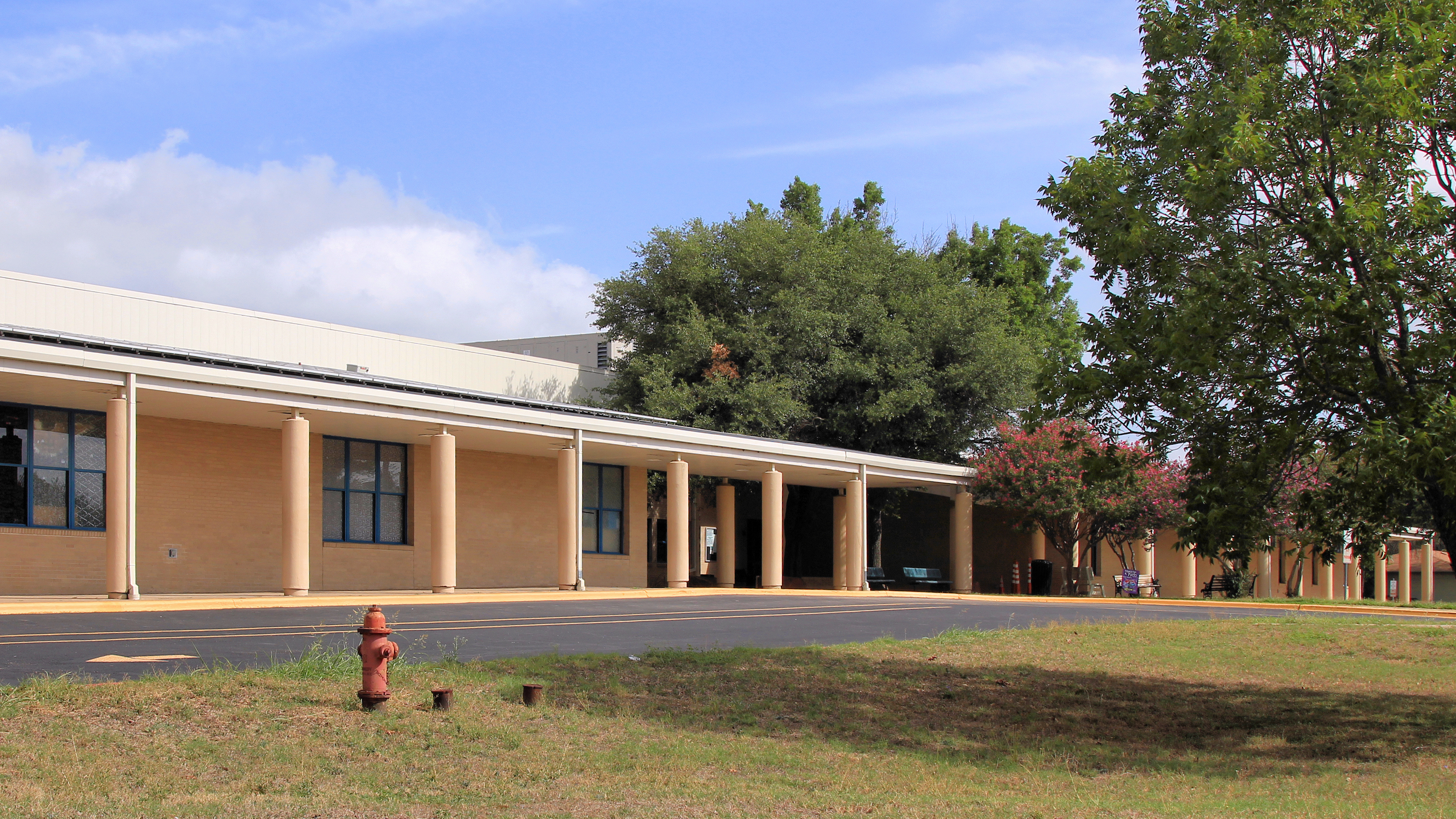
Kocurek Elementary School

It is in the Austin Independent School District. Kocurek Elementary School is the local elementary.

Headwaters School (formerly Khabele School) Creek Campus is in Tanglewood Forest.

== Demographics ==
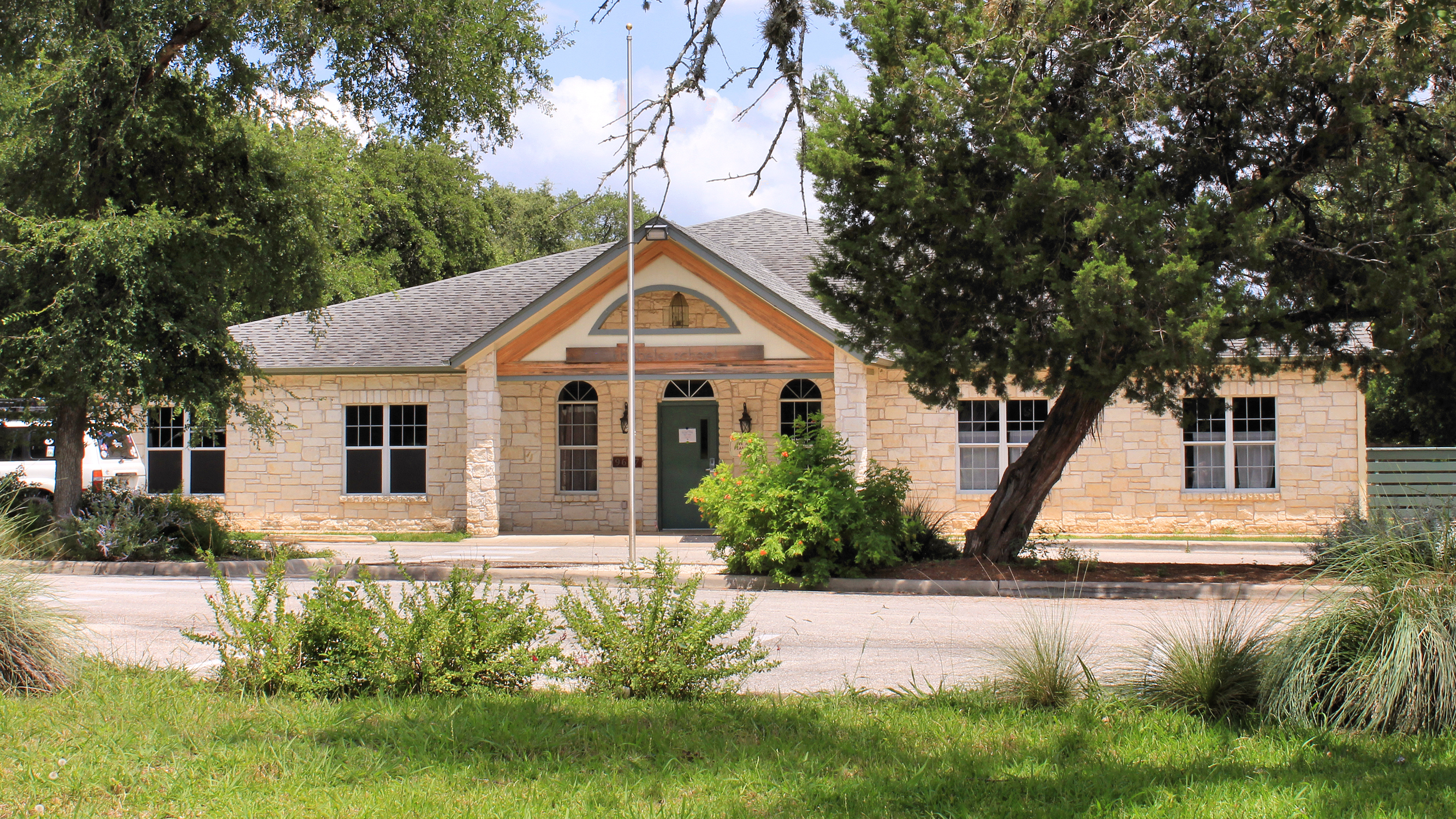
Headwaters School Creek Campus

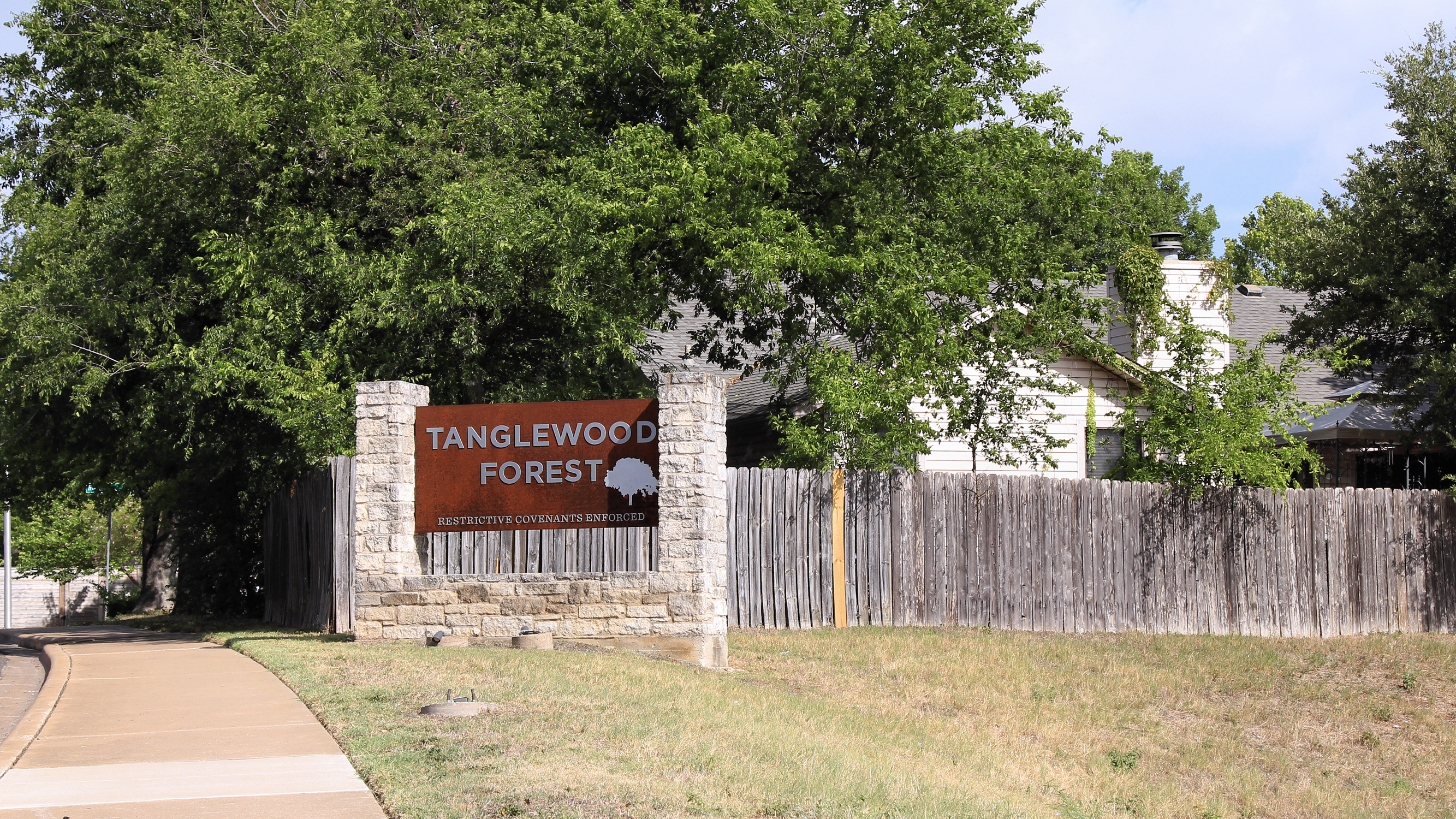
Tanglewood Forest entrance sign

Historical population
Census	Pop.	Note	%±
1990	2,941		—
U.S. Decennial Census; 1850–1900 1910; 1920 1930 1940; 1950 1960 1970; 1980 1990 2000; 2010 2020

Tanglewood first appeared as a census designated place in the 1990 U.S. census; and absorbed in the city of Austin prior to the 2000 U.S. census.
