= Hollywood/Santa Monica, Dallas =

Neighborhood in Dallas, Texas, USA

Hollywood/Santa Monica
- Neighborhood
- Location within DFW Location within Texas Location within the United States
- Coordinates: 32°48′22.18″N 96°44′25.26″W
- Country: United States
- State: Texas
- County: Dallas
- City: Dallas
- Area: East Dallas
- Elevation: 525 ft (160 m)
- ZIP code: 75223
- Area codes: 214, 469, 972

Hollywood/Santa Monica (often called Hollywood Heights) is a historic, affluent neighborhood in old east Dallas, Texas, United States. The neighborhood is located northwest of SH 78 (East Grand Avenue). To the southwest, its boundaries are defined by Sarasota and Valencia streets, while the Santa Fe Trail forms a dome-shaped boundary to the north. The neighborhood is part of a special conservation district to protect the Hollywood Heights and Santa Monica subdivisions and is known for having one of the largest intact collections of stone-embellished 1920s and 1930s Tudor cottages in the United States.

== About ==
Hollywood/Santa Monica was one of the first conservation districts established in the City of Dallas. It was created after a two-year effort to preserve the architectural integrity, and value of the homes in the area. Many of the area homes were built in the Tudor style before World War II. The neighborhood boasts over 800 homes bordered by the Santa Fe Trail and East Grand Avenue.

Residents enjoy access to several parks such as Lindsley Park , Tenison Park Golf Course, the Tenison Park Pollinator Garden , and Samuell-Grand Park, which offers tennis, pickleball, and Shakespeare in the Park. The neighborhood is also close to White Rock Lake, with the Santa Fe Hike and Bike Trail running through the area, connecting to the White Rock Creek Trail, the Dallas Arboretum and Botanical Garden and the Lakewood neighborhood.

== History ==
Originally the site of a dairy farm, residential development began in Hollywood/Santa Monica in the early 1920s when developer J.B. Salmon formed the Hollywood Land Company and began building mostly Tudor-style cottages in the neighborhood. Many of the Tudors are accented with stonework which provides a unique Texas twist to the European Tudor-style architecture. According to the neighborhood association, Hollywood Heights may be the largest collection of intact Tudor-style homes with this type of unique architecture in the United States. The neighborhood considers itself founded in 1924 and has been designated a conservation district since 1989.

== Education ==
Hollywood/Santa Monica is in the Dallas Independent School District (DISD).

The residents are zoned to Lakewood Elementary, J. L. Long Middle School, and Woodrow Wilson High School.

Other area schools include the K-8 school Eduardo Mata Montessori School, also a DISD school, and the Lindsley Park Community School, a charter elementary school operated by Lumin Education.

=== Gallery Of Public Schools ===
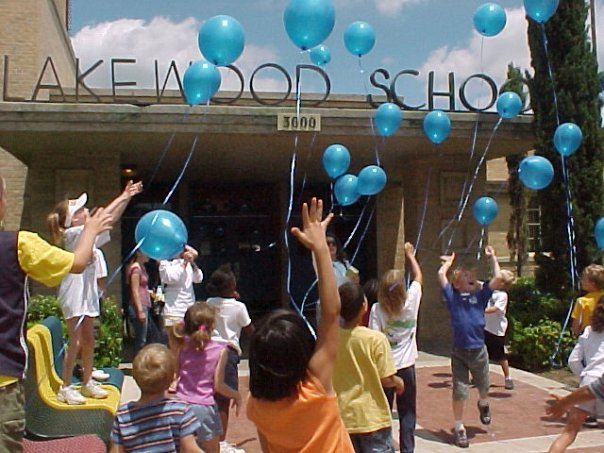
Lakewood Elementary School

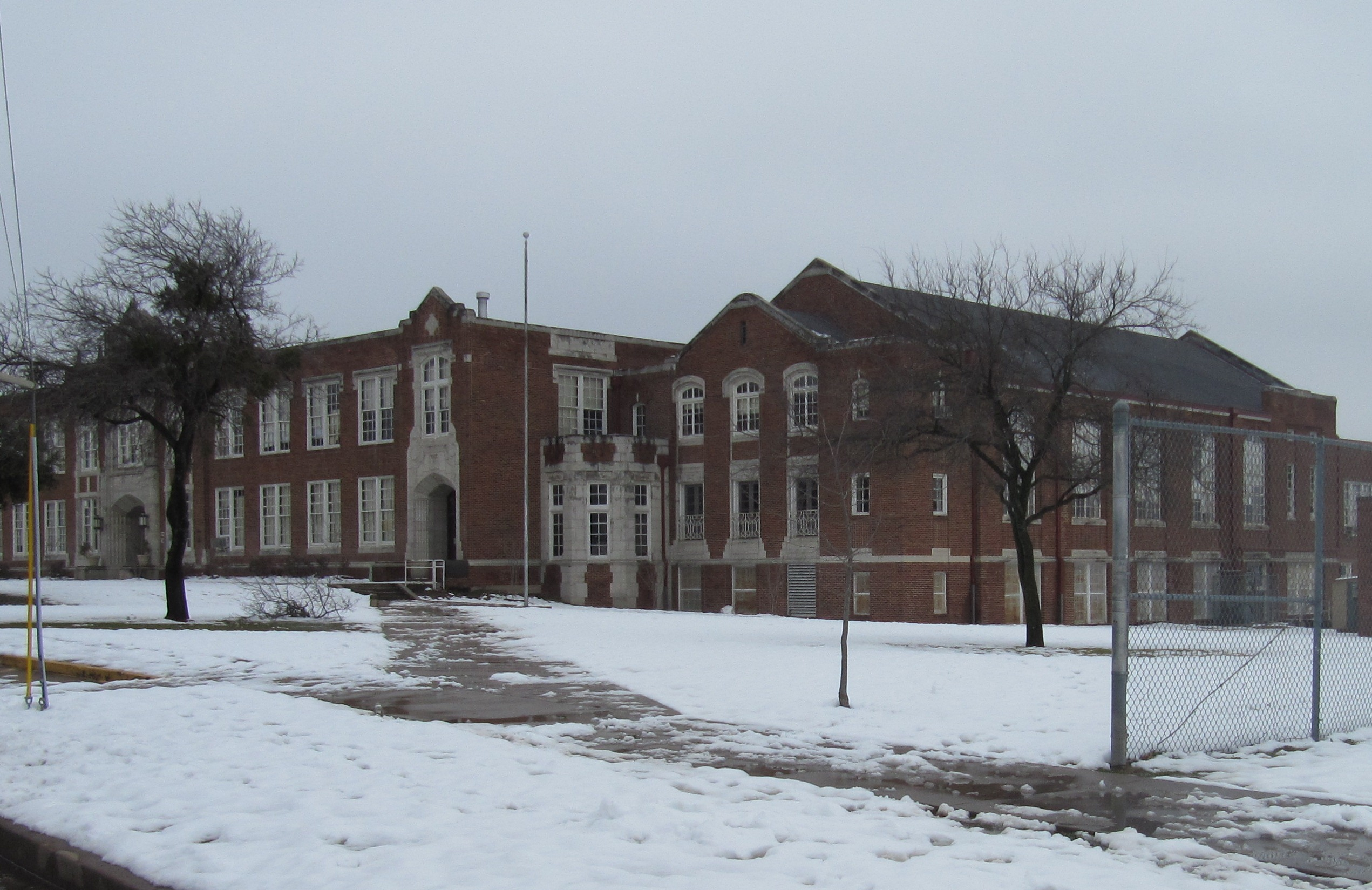
J.L. Long Middle School

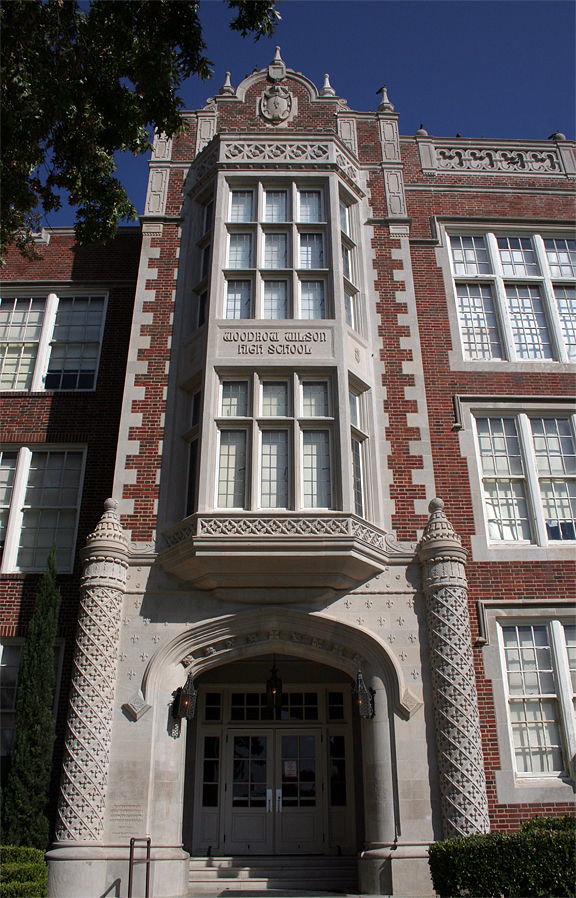
Woodrow Wilson High School

=== Private Schools ===
There are several private schools, including Spanish World School for ages 3 months-5th grade, Lakehill Preparatory School K-12, East Grand Preparatory PK-8, Cityscape Early Childhood Center PK 3-4, St. Bernard of Clairvaux Catholic School PK 3-8, Bishop Lynch High School, among others.

- Lakehill Preparatory School
- Saint Thomas Aquinas School
- Bishop Lynch High School
- Lakewood Presbyterian School

=== Preschool Programs ===
Lakewood Early Childhood PTA serves the area. Spanish World School Elementary

== Things To Do ==
The White Rock YMCA, located on Gaston Avenue, features a swimming pool, gymnasium, and programs for all ages.

Nearby shopping destinations include Lakewood Shopping Center, Skillman Live Oak, Lakeview Center, Arboretum Village, Hillside Village, Casa Linda, Mockingbird Station, and NorthPark Center, as well as a variety of boutiques and restaurants along Lower and Lowest Greenville Avenue, Deep Ellum, Uptown, and Knox-Henderson.

East Dallas Trails provide hiking, biking and walking trails connecting White Rock Lake, the Great Trinity Forest, and Downtown. Other East Dallas trails include the Flag Pole Hill Trail, Cottonwood Creek Trail as well as park trails at Lakewood Park, Tietze Park and Winfrey Point Park.

Granada Theater (Dallas) Granada Theater (Dallas) showcases concerts featuring popular entertainers and world-class comedians.

== Popular Events ==
Hollywood Home Tour & Wine Walk

The Shakespeare Festival of Dallas debuted in 1972 in the Bandshell at Fair Park before moving to its current home at Samuell Grand Amphitheatre — appropriately in Samuell Grand Park — in 1989. The Shakespeare in the Park plays are put on every summer and it is the second oldest Shakespeare Festival in the US

== Media ==
Advocate Magazines is the local magazine that covers a variety of neighborhood topics and has served the community since 1991.

D Magazine articles:

1. https://www.dmagazine.com/home-garden/2024/05/hollywood-heights-santa-monica-is-keeping-it-100/
2. https://www.dmagazine.com/home-garden/2018/05/open-houses-to-hit-in-dallas-this-weekend-3/?_gl=1*1oew3v2*_ga*MjEyNjcyNzYzNi4xNzk0NTA2NDg2*_ga_YV5G2GS8WW*czE3OTQ1MDY0ODYkbzEkZzEkdDE3OTQ1MDY2OTkkajUwJGwwJGgw
3. https://www.dmagazine.com/home-garden/2017/05/hot-property-tudor-gem-in-hollywood-heights/
