= List of middle schools in Albuquerque, New Mexico =

The following is a list of middle schools in Albuquerque, New Mexico.

- Albuquerque Academy
- Albuquerque Institute for Mathematics and Science
- Cleveland Middle School
- Cottonwood Classical Preparatory School
- Desert Ridge Middle School
- Eisenhower Middle School
- Ernie Pyle Middle School
- Garfield Middle School
- Grant Middle School
- Harrison Middle School
- Hayes Middle School
- Hoover Middle School
- Jackson Middle School
- James Monroe Middle School
- Jefferson Middle School
- Jimmy Carter Middle School
- John Adams Middle School
- Kennedy Middle School
- L. B. Johnson Middle School
- Madison Middle School
- McKinley Middle School
- New Mexico Academy for the Media Arts
- Polk Middle School
- Roosevelt Middle School
- Sandia Preparatory School
- Taft Middle School
- Taylor Middle School
- Tony Hillerman Middle School
- Truman Middle School
- Van Buren Middle School
- Washington Middle School
  - 2021 Washington Middle School Shooting
- Wilson Middle School
