= Trinity Episcopal School of Austin =

Location
- 3901 Bee Caves Road; West Lake Hills, Texas 78746; United States; 30.281426°N 97.808725°W

Information
- Type: Private school
- Established: 1999
- Principal: Jennifer Morgan
- Faculty: 91
- Grades: K-8
- Enrollment: 534 (2017-2018)
- Team name: Tornado
- Website: austintrinity.org

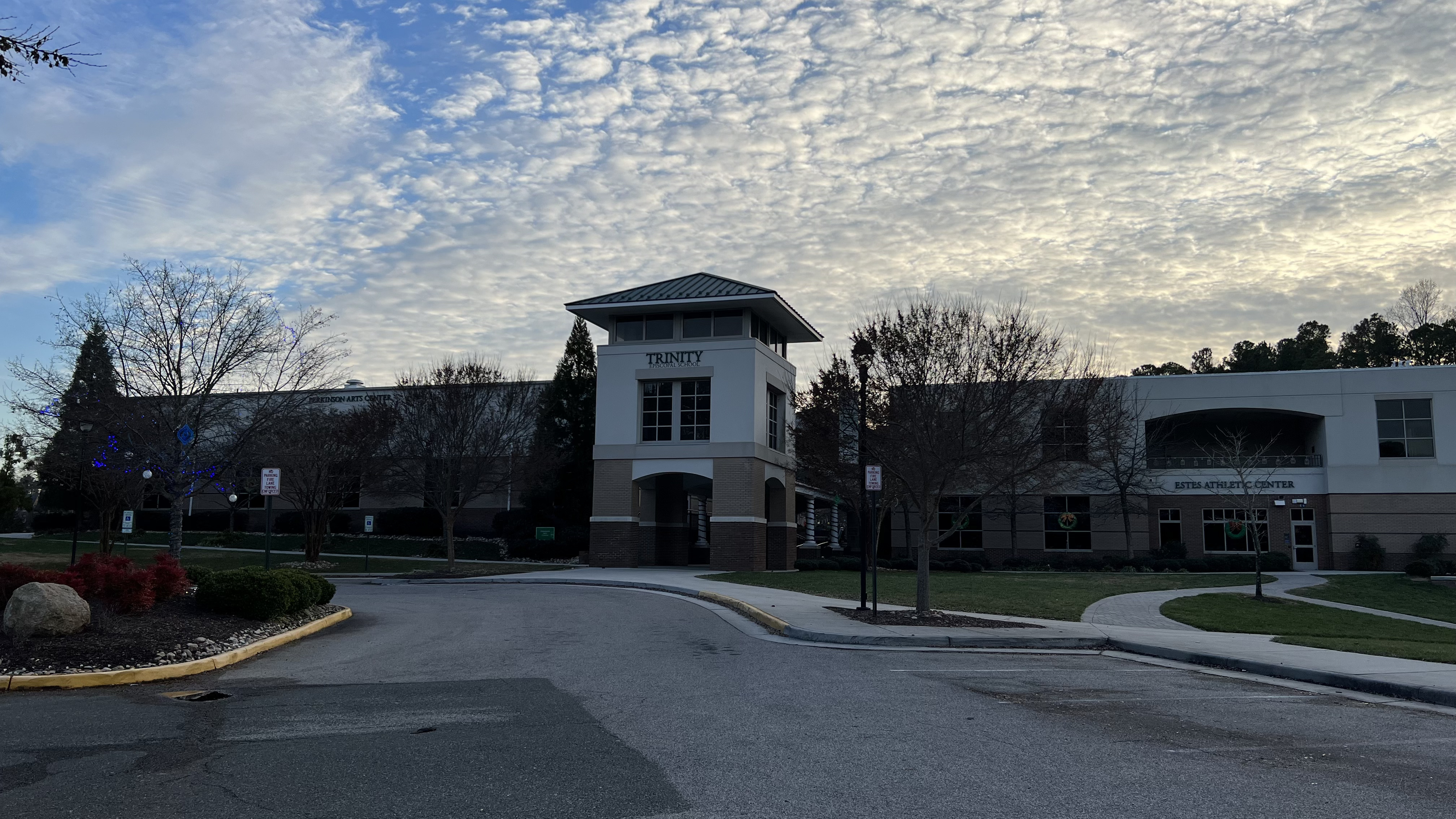
Trinity Episcopal School

Trinity Episcopal School is a K-8 independent co-ed day school in Austin, Texas. The school was founded in 1999 in a rented blue house near the University of Texas campus. Since that inaugural year, the school moved to a 15-acre (61,000 m^{2}) campus in West Lake Hills and built seven buildings.Trinity Episcopal School recently developed a Preschool, titled Blue House Preschool. Trinity Episcopal School is accredited by the Independent Schools Association of the Southwest and the Southwestern Association of Episcopal Schools.

== Academics ==
Trinity's Lower School uses a workshop approach for the teaching of reading and writing. Developed by Lucy Calkins of Columbia University, the workshop approach develops writers who have confidence in their own voices and fluency with a number of different formats and styles. Trinity's math program develops math fluency, treating the subject as a language to understand rather than a series of facts to memorize. The vertically integrated curriculum embeds basic algebraic and geometric concepts into the earliest math education and incorporates the workshop approach developed by Catherine Fosnot of the City College of New York.

In the Middle School, students have an opportunity to complete both Algebra 1 and Geometry by the end of their 8th grade year. Students can also earn high school credit for a number of other classes, including Latin, World Languages, and Integrated Physics and Chemistry.

Trinity's Head of School is Jennifer Morgan. Its Head of Lower School is Shanna Hines and its Head of Middle School is Shanna Weiss.

== Episcopal Tradition ==
Trinity offers daily chapel in both the Lower School and the Middle School, as well as the Preschool. The Chaplain is Pastor Adam Varner.

== Athletics ==
The Trinity Tornado competes in the Austin Inter Parochial League (AIPL) in the following sports:

Girls: Cross-Country, Volleyball, Basketball, Lacrosse, Soccer, Tennis, Track, Golf, Swimming

Boys: Cross-Country, Tackle Football, Flag Football, Basketball, Soccer, Lacrosse, Tennis, Track, Golf, Swimming

== Arts ==
Trinity has an arts program that incorporates both elective courses and extracurricular activities. The school hosts a school-wide art show each spring, has several choirs and solo opportunities, and a drama department that produces a fall drama and a spring musical. Trinity's Varsity Choir won the Best in Class trophy at the 2009 Lone Star Showcase choral competition in Dallas.
