= Episcopal School of Acadiana =

Episcopal School of Acadiana (ESA)

Location
- 1557 Smede Road; Cade, (St. Martin Parish), Louisiana 70518; United States; 30.0855°N 91.9131°W

Information
- Type: Private high school
- Established: 1979
- Headmaster: Dr. Paul Baker
- Colors: Blue and gray
- Mascot: Falcon
- Nickname: Falcons
- Yearbook: Falcon's Flight

Episcopal School of Acadiana (ESA) is a coeducational day school of the Episcopal Diocese of Western Louisiana for students in grades PreK-3 through 12. The Lower School, serving students in PreK-3 through fifth grades, is located in Lafayette, Louisiana. The Middle and Upper School campus, for students in sixth through twelfth grades, is located in Cade, Louisiana, between Lafayette and New Iberia. ESA draws students from throughout the Greater Lafayette area. The school is accredited by the Independent Schools Association of the Southwest. The address is 1557 Smede Hwy. Broussard, LA 70518

== History ==
In August 1979, eleven teachers and 87 students met in the basement of the First Baptist Church in Lafayette, Louisiana and established the Middle and Upper Schools of The Episcopal School of Acadiana. ESA's founders believed the founding of the school should focus on three key areas: becoming the best academic program in the Acadiana area; an institution built on the history and traditions of the Christian church; and a solid athletic program with intramural and varsity teams.

== Affiliations ==
The school is a member of several local, regional, and national educational and religious associations.

== Athletics ==
Episcopal School of Acadiana athletics competes in the Louisiana High School Athletic Association (LHSAA) in the "B" classification (schools without a football program).

ESA supports several sports including cross-country, boys' and girls' soccer, boys' basketball, baseball, swimming, track and field, and boys' and girls' tennis.

The school has won the Class B Ford Cup for the most outstanding athletics in the state of Louisiana for 11 consecutive years.

=== Championships ===
Volleyball Championships
The girls' volleyball team holds a national record of 16 consecutive state championships.

Rugby Championships
The school also has a non-LHSAA mandated rugby football club, which won two state championship titles in 2006 and 2009. As of 2023, ESA no longer plays rugby.

ESA has won 96 state championships since its opening in 1979. The volleyball team won state championships in 1987, 1988, 1989, 1990, 1991, 1992, 1993, 1994, 1995, 1996, 1997, 1998, 1999, 2000, 2001, 2002, and 2006. The girls' track team won state championships in 2000, 2001, 2002, 2003, 2005, 2006, 2007, 2016, 2017, 2018, and 2019. The boys' track team won state championships in 2023 and 2024. The girls' tennis team won state championships in 1984, 1989, 1991, 1992, 1993, 1994, 1995, 2002, 2004, 2005, 2006, 2007, and 2010. The boys' tennis team won state championships in 1988, 1993, 1994, 1995, 1997, 2000, 2007, 2008, and 2013. The boys' swimming team won a state championship in 2005. The girls' swimming team won a state championship in 2021, 2022, and 2023. The boys' soccer team won state championships in 1990 and 2018. The boys' golf team won state championships in 1991, 1992, 1993, 2010, 2015, 2016, 2017, and 2023. The boys' cross country team won state championships in 1984, 1991, 1994, 1995, 1997, 1998, 1999, 2000, 2001, 2014, 2015, 2016, 2017, 2018, 2019, 2020, and 2022. The girls' cross country team won state championships in 1999, 2003, 2004, 2005, 2006, 2007, 2015, 2016, 2017, 2019, and 2020. The boys' rugby team won state championships in 2006 and 2009.

== Notable people ==
- Kris Cox, a professional golfer, graduated from ESA.
- Preston Robinson, Chief of Staff to U.S. Senator Kennedy, graduated from ESA.
- Chanda Rubin, Professional tennis player graduated from ESA in 1993.
