= Lakewood, Dallas =

Neighborhood in Dallas, Texas, USA

Lakewood
- Neighborhood
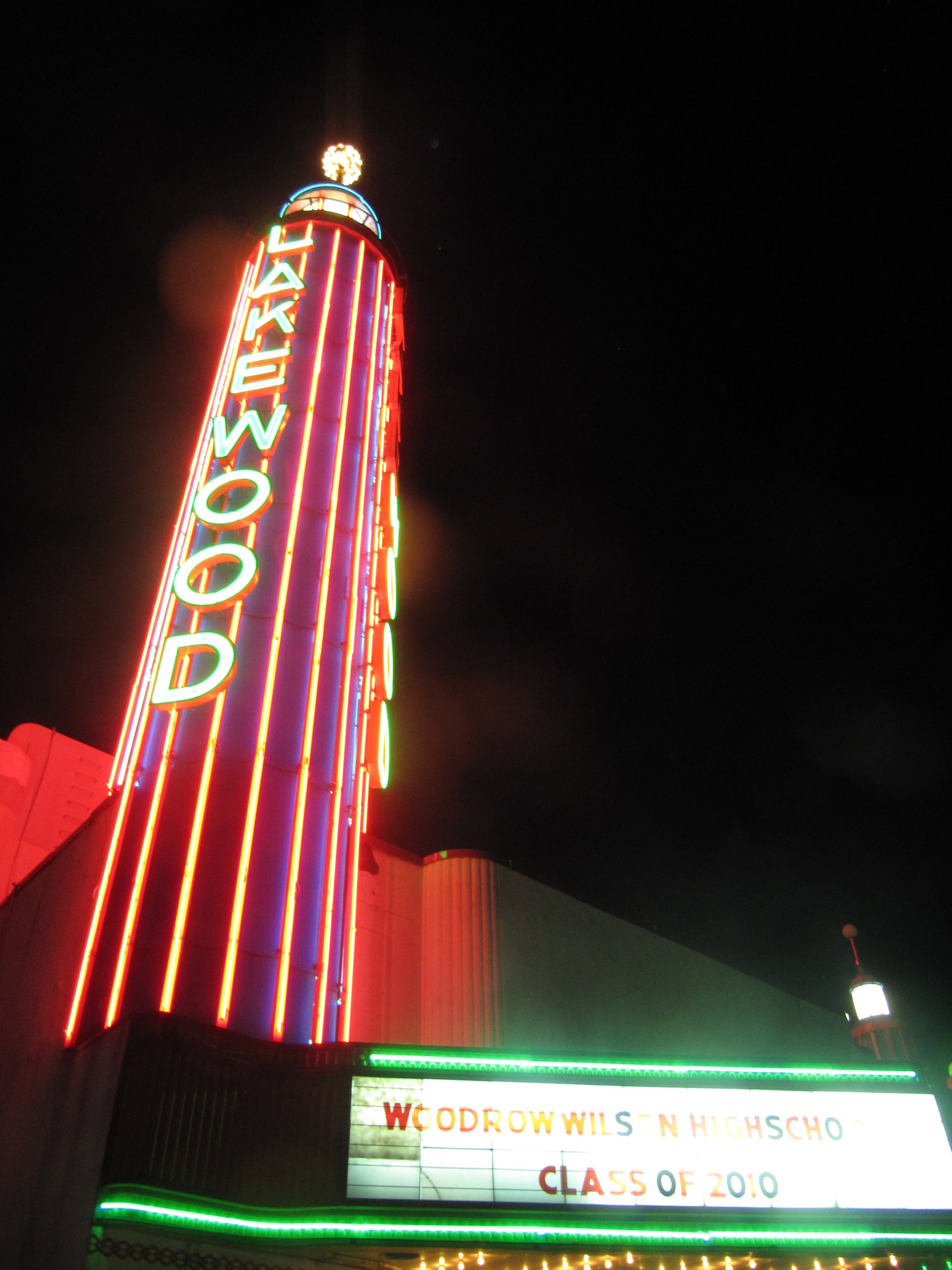
- The Lakewood Theater opened in 1938 with Love Finds Andy Hardy

- Location within DFW Location within Texas Location within the United States
- Coordinates: 32.8345°N 96.7428°W
- Country: United States of America
- State: Texas
- County: Dallas County
- City: Dallas
- Time zone: UTC-6:00 (CST)
  - Summer (DST): UTC-5:00 (CDT)

Lakewood is a neighborhood in East Dallas, Texas (USA). It is adjacent to White Rock Lake and northeast of Downtown Dallas. Lakewood is bound by Mockingbird Lane to the north, Abrams Road to the west, Gaston Avenue to the south, and White Rock Lake to the east.

== About ==
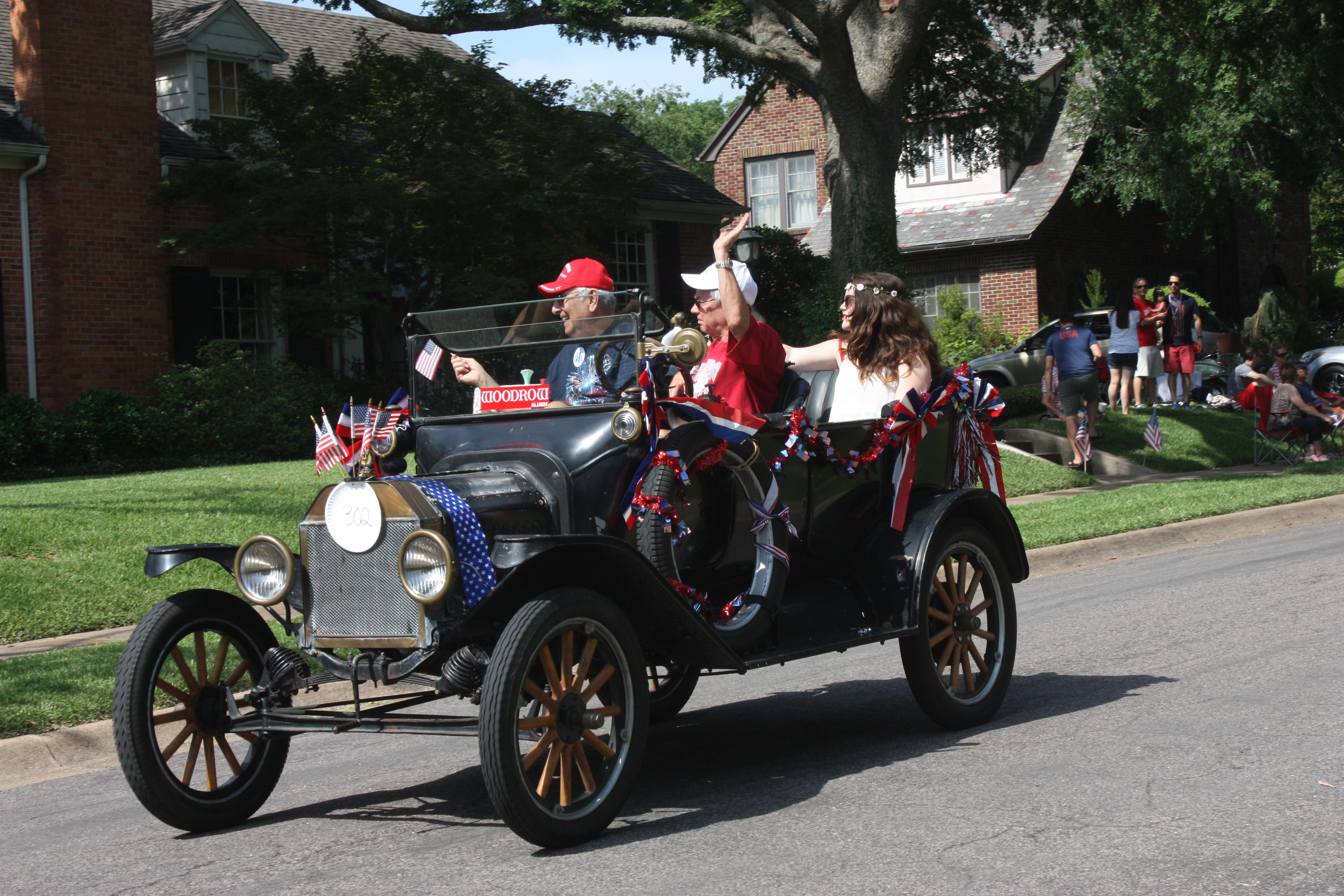
A parade float in the Lakewood 4th of July Parade.

Lakewood has the historic Lakewood Theater, which used to show classic films and host contemporary musical and comedy events. It has been renovated to house a bowling alley and gaming business, but retains the original exterior look and many interior elements. The Lakewood shopping area is an entire neighborhood of diverse restaurants and shopping venues. Nearby the Dallas Arboretum and Botanical Gardens has an extensive children's adventure garden housed within its 66 acres. Both overlook the White Rock Lake.

Lakewood is also home to Lakewood Country Club.

=== History ===
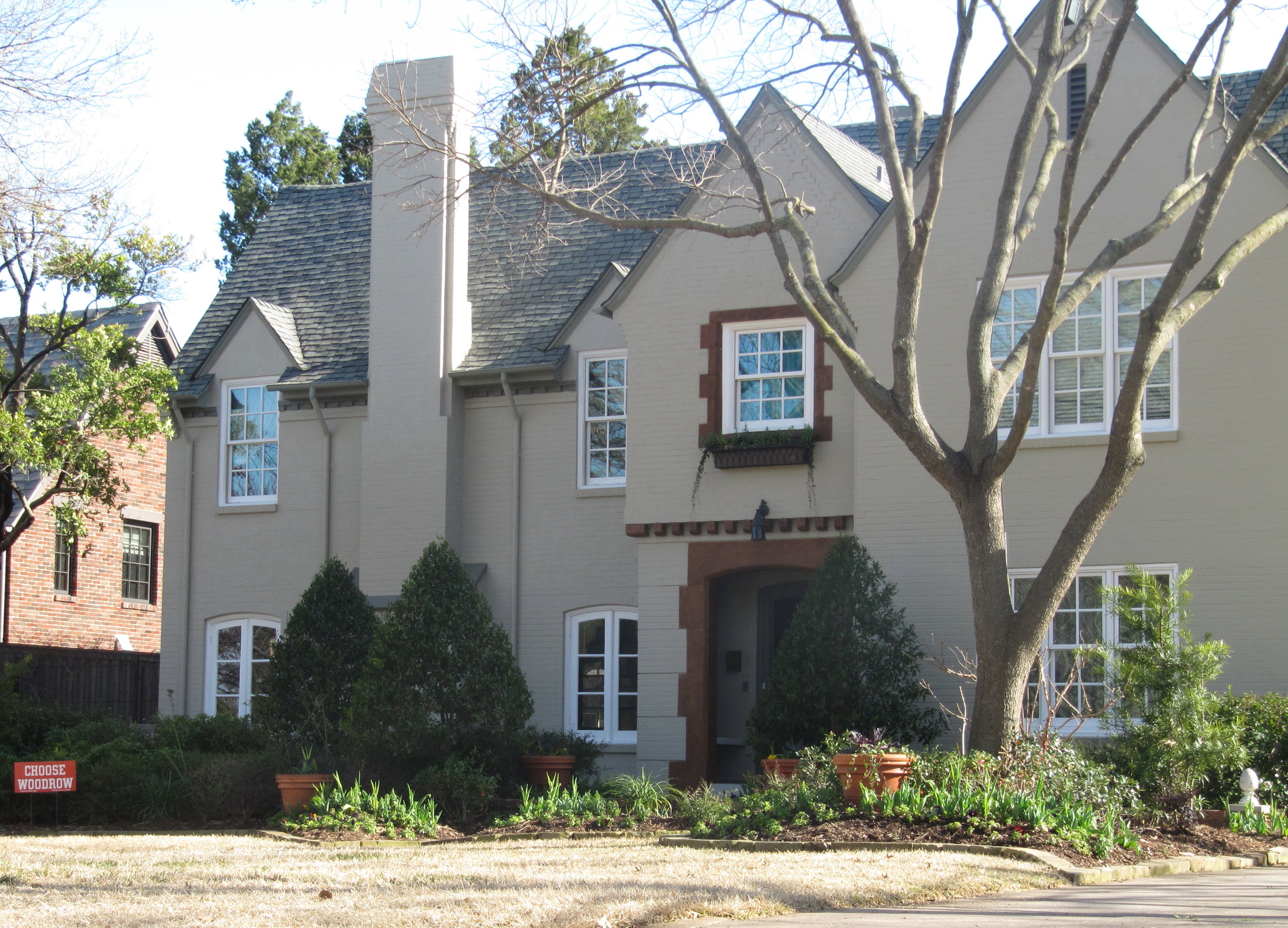
Lakewood Boulevard includes many 1920s and 1930s mansions and estates. Most are in the Tudor styles by Dines and Kraft or Mediterranean-Hollywood styles by Clifford Hutsell. This is the former home of the "Mayor of Lakewood" Jim Young and "First Lady" Barbara Young.

Lakewood proper is surrounded by a collection of historic neighborhoods, generally developed from the early 20th century to the 1950s, including Lakewood Heights, Junius Heights Historic District (Bungalow Heaven), Parks Estates, North Stonewall Terrace, Caruth Terrace, Wilshire Heights, Mockingbird Heights, Mockingbird Meadows, The Gated Cloisters, Hillside, Lakewood Hills (formerly Gastonwood-Coronado Hills), Hollywood Heights, and Belmont; among others. Commonly, people outside these neighborhoods group them together under the heading of Lakewood, The M-Streets, or Old East Dallas - which are overlapping regions in the near-eastern part of the city. Historic Swiss Avenue (Mansion Row) anchors the area towards Downtown.

Currently, there is a large number of Historic and Conservation Districts reflecting prodigious numbers of Craftsman, Prairie-Four Squares, Tudors, Spanish and Mediterranean Eclectic and Early Ranch homes, many of native Austin stone. Conservation Districts are zoning tools used by the city of Dallas to regulate various architectural aspects of a home's construction. The homes range from two-bedroom bungalows to massive estates on acreage. There are also duplexes, four-plexes and very small apartment complexes.

Some of the older, smaller homes are being torn down in favor of much larger, more expensive homes.

== Government and infrastructure ==
The United States Postal Service operates the Lakewood Post Office at 6120 Swiss Avenue.

== Education ==
=== Primary and secondary schools ===
==== Public schools (DISD) ====
The Dallas Independent School District serves the Lakewood area. The area is within Trustee District 2D. In 2008 Jack Lowe represented the district, and it is now represented by Dustin Marshall.

Public schools serving the Lakewood subdivision include Lakewood Elementary School (K-5), J.L. Long Middle School (6-8), and Woodrow Wilson High School (9-12). Woodrow Wilson offers the IB Diploma Programme.

Eduardo Mata Montessori School, a K-8 school, gives second admission priority to people zoned to Woodrow Wilson High. Therefore, Lakewood is one of the neighborhoods with priority for the school.

Lakewood is also home of Lumin Education, a Montessori charter school serving ages 3 through 3rd grade.

===== Gallery of public schools =====
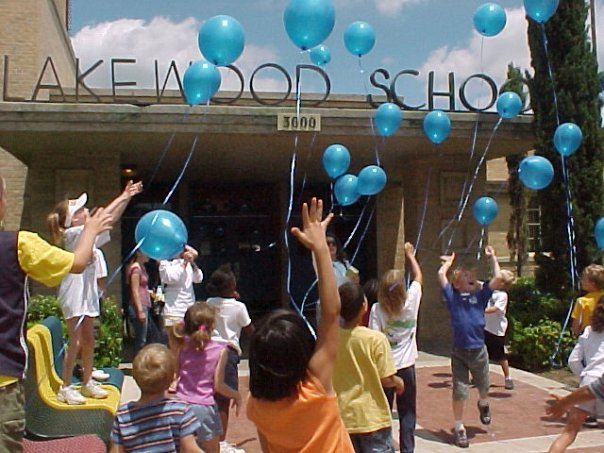
Lakewood Elementary School

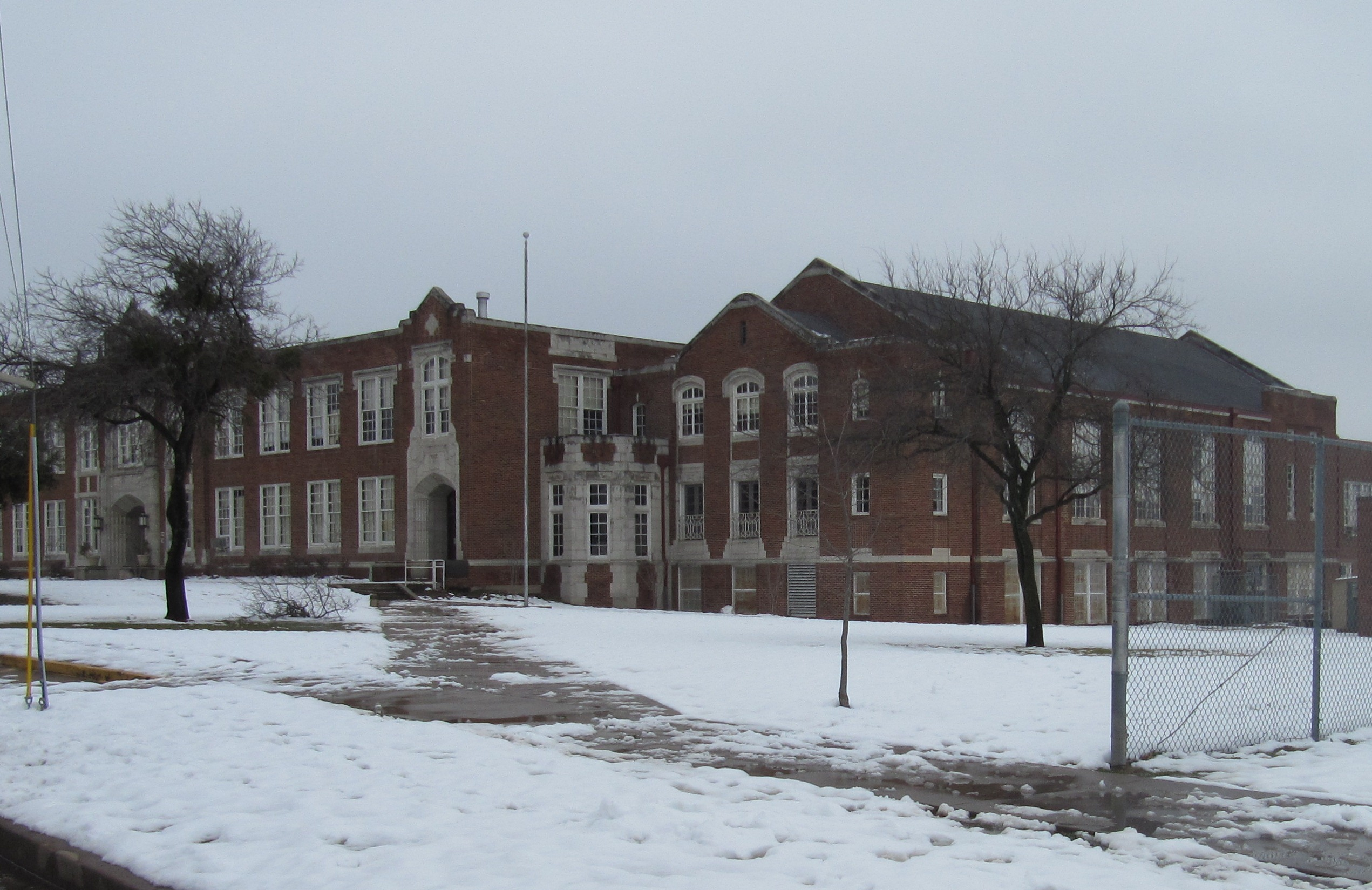
J.L. Long Middle School

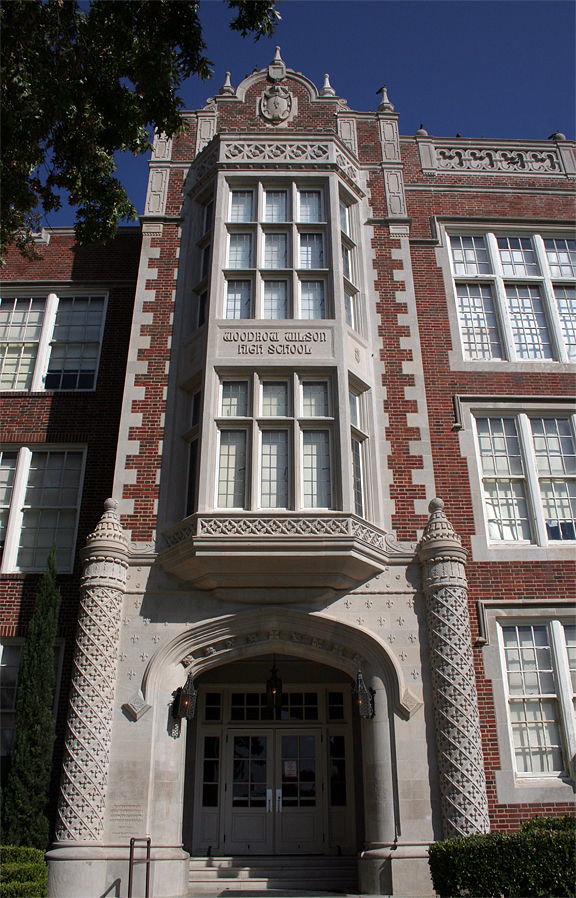
Woodrow Wilson High School

==== Private schools ====
- Lakehill Preparatory School
- Saint Thomas Aquinas School
- Lakewood Presbyterian School

=== Preschool programs ===
Lakewood Early Childhood PTA serves the area.

=== Public libraries ===
The Dallas Public Library Lakewood Branch is located at 6121 Worth Street, 75214. The library is in Junius Heights.

== Postal services ==
The United States Postal Service operates the Lakewood Post Office at 6120 Swiss Avenue, 75214-9998.

== Popular events ==
=== Entertainment ===
The Shakespeare Festival of Dallas debuted in 1972 in the Bandshell at Fair Park before moving to its current home at Samuell Grand Amphitheatre — appropriately in Samuell Grand Park — in 1989.

== Media ==
Advocate Magazines is the local magazine that covers a variety of neighborhood topics and has served the community since 1991.

== Notable residents ==
• Dusty Hill - ZZ Top (1949-2021)

- Herbert Marcus – Co-founder and CEO of Neiman-Marcus (1878–1950)
