= Independent Schools Association of the Southwest =

Coordinates: 32.001936°N 102.078514°W

- Formation: 1955
- Headquarters: Dallas, Texas
- CEO: Scott Griggs
- Board President: Merry Sorrells
- Revenue: $1.2 million (2019)
- Expenses: $1.1 million (2019)
- Website: www.isasw.org

The Independent Schools Association of the Southwest (ISAS) is a nonprofit association of 89 independent schools located in the U.S. states of Arizona, Kansas, Louisiana, New Mexico, Oklahoma, and Texas. ISAS is a member of the National Association of Independent Schools (NAIS) Commission on Accreditation.

== History ==
In 1952, “The Association of Texas Preparatory Schools,” a football and basketball league among five private Texas schools (The Kinkaid School, Lutheran, St. John’s School, St. Mark's School of Texas, and St. Stephen's Episcopal School), was founded. This association was to serve as a predecessor for ISAS: in 1955, largely under the influence of St. John's headmaster Alan Chidsey, four of the same institutions (Kinkaid, St. John's, St. Stephen's, and St. Mark's) joined together with three additional Texas schools (The Hockaday School, Saint Mary’s Hall, and the Texas Military Institute) and one Oklahoma school (Casady School) to found the Independent Schools Association of the Southwest. The original "statement of purpose" of the association was to "encourage, support, and develop highest standards of attainment in the independent schools of the area and to recognize those schools in which they are maintained.” In 1966, the stated purpose was amended to include the phrase "to recognize by formal accreditation,” and an additional accreditation requirement was imposed: at least 75% of the graduates of each member school must complete their first year of college.

By ISAS's quinquagenary anniversary in 2005, the association had grown to include 84 schools spanning six states; in the same year, the Southwest Preparatory Conference (SPC) split from ISAS to form an independent athletic conference. By 2012, ISAS had expanded to include all of its current 89 member schools.

== Arts festival ==
Since 1967, the Independent Schools Association of the Southwest has held its annual ISAS Arts Festival, hosted at a different member schools' campus each year. The popular event typically lasts three days, during which time students from the various art programs of upwards of thirty ISAS member schools congregate in a noncompetitive atmosphere to perform and create art in "a celebration of sharing and learning with critiques by professional artists and performers." Recent years' ISAS Arts Festivals, such as the 2016 Festival hosted at Saint Mary's Hall in San Antonio, Texas, have seen attendances of more than 3,000 student artists.

== Member institutions ==
Arizona

- All Saints' Episcopal Day School
- The Gregory School
- Phoenix Country Day School

Kansas

- Wichita Collegiate School

Louisiana

- Academy of the Sacred Heart (New Orleans)
- Schools of the Sacred Heart at Grand Coteau
- Alexandria Country Day School
- Christ Episcopal School
- Ecole Bilingue de la Nouvelle-Orléans
- Episcopal School of Acadiana
- Isidore Newman School
- Jewish Community Day School
- Louise S. McGehee School
- Metairie Park Country Day School
- Southfield School
- St. Andrew's Episcopal School, New Orleans
- St. George's Episcopal School
- St. Martin's Episcopal School
- St. Paul's Episcopal School, New Orleans
- Stuart Hall School for Boys
- Trinity Episcopal School New Orleans

New Mexico

- Albuquerque Academy
- Bosque School
- Manzano Day School
- Rio Grande School
- Sandia Preparatory School
- Santa Fe Preparatory School
- UWC-USA

Oklahoma

- Casady School
- Heritage Hall School
- Holland Hall
- Riverfield Country Day School
- Westminster School

Texas

- Alcuin School
- All Saints' Episcopal School, Fort Worth
- All Saints Episcopal School, Tyler
- Allen Academy
- Annunciation Orthodox School
- Austin International School
- Austin Waldorf School
- The Awty International School
- The Branch School
- The Briarwood School
- Cistercian Preparatory School
- Dallas International School
- Duchesne Academy of the Sacred Heart
- The Emery/Weiner School
- Episcopal High School, Houston
- The Episcopal School of Dallas
- The Fay School, Houston
- Fort Worth Academy
- Fort Worth Country Day
- The Girls' School of Austin
- Good Shepherd Episcopal School
- Greenhill School
- Headwaters School, Austin
- The Hockaday School
- Houston Christian High School
- Jack Segal Academy at Beth Yeshurun
- The John Cooper School
- The Joy School
- Keystone School
- The Kinkaid School
- Lakehill Preparatory School
- The Lamplighter School
- The Montessori School of San Antonio
- The Oakridge School
- Parish Episcopal School
- The Post Oak School
- Presbyterian School
- The Regis School of the Sacred Heart
- River Oaks Baptist School
- Saint Mary's Hall
- San Antonio Academy
- Shelton School
- The Shlenker School
- St. Andrew's Episcopal School, Austin
- St. Clement's Parish School
- St. Francis Episcopal Day School
- St. John's Episcopal School, Dallas
- St. John's School, Houston
- St. Luke's Episcopal School
- St. Mark's Episcopal School
- St. Mark's School of Texas
- St. Michael's Catholic Preparatory School
- St. Philip's School and Community Center
- St. Stephen's Episcopal School
- TMI - The Episcopal School of Texas
- Trinity Episcopal School, Austin
- Trinity Episcopal School, Galveston
- Trinity School of Midland
- Trinity Valley School
- Ursuline Academy of Dallas
- The Winston School, Dallas
- The Winston School San Antonio
