= Lakewood Country Club =

Country club in Dallas, Texas

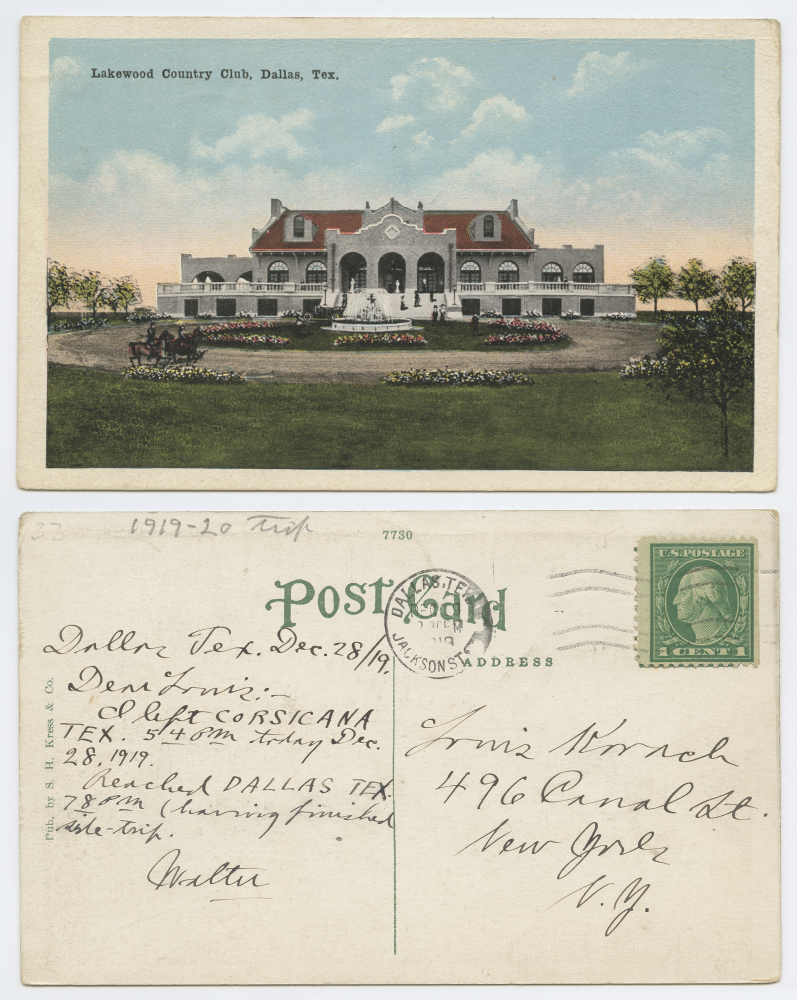
- Lakewood Country Club, circa 1919
- Interactive map of Lakewood Country Club

Club information
- Location: Dallas, Texas
- Established: 1912
- Type: Private
- Total holes: 18
- Tournaments: Dallas Open (1944)
- Website: www.lakewoodcc.com
- Designed by: Tom Bendelow, Bill Coore and Ben Crenshaw
- Par: 71
- Length: 6,742
- Course rating: 73.5
- Slope rating: 135

Lakewood Country Club is a private country club in Dallas, Texas, United States, founded in 1912, and is now often referred to simply as Lakewood. It is located at the corner of Gaston and Abrams Avenues in Lakewood, Dallas, Texas, about five miles east, northeast of downtown Dallas. Lakewood Country Club hosted the Texas Victory Open, a PGA Tour golf tournament now known as the HP Byron Nelson Championship, in 1944, the only year the tournament was won by renowned professional golfer Byron Nelson, who is now the tournament's namesake. The club has trained and sponsored other renowned golfers such as Sam Snead, Ben Hogan, Jimmy Thompson, Billy Burke, Betty Jamison, Reynolds Smith and Harry Todd.

== History ==
=== Original Construction ===
Collett Munger and George Aldredge founded Lakewood Country Club in 1912. The second oldest club in Dallas, Lakewood Country Club was considered out in the country and no paved roads led to the site.

The golf course at Lakewood was originally designed by Tom Bendelow. The club is located on 129 acres at the corner of Abrams Road and Gaston Avenue.

=== Plummer Renovation ===
In 1947 was redesigned by Ralph Plummer. Plummer’s post World War II changes significantly improved the layout and they remained in place until the mid-1990s

=== Clubhouse Renovation ===
Today’s clubhouse, which faces Gaston, was constructed in 1959 after a fire at the original property. A renovation in 1985 provided an additional 8,000 square feet.

=== Coore and Crenshaw Renovations ===
In 1995, Bill Coore and Ben Crenshaw gave the course another facelift. They reinvigorated the layout by repositioning tees, improving the bunkers, and changing the playing surfaces to Bermuda fairways and bent greens.

Further renovation work took place in the new millennium, so that Lakewood is now more of a Coore and Crenshaw track than a Bendelow and Plummer layout. Bill and Ben recreated the driving range in 2011 then returned three years for a facelift which saw the installation of a new irrigation system, the removal of trees and the redesign of bunkers.
