= Christ Episcopal School =

Location
- 80 Christwood Boulevard, Covington, Louisiana 70433 (grades 1-12); 120 S. New Hampshire Street Covington, LA 70433 (Preschool and kindergarten); United States; 30.4382°N 90.1434°W

Information
- Type: Private, college-prep, day
- Denomination: Episcopal Church
- Established: 1984
- CEEB code: 190577
- Chairperson: Brian Grubb
- Head of school: Dr. John Murray
- Teaching staff: 87.0 (on an FTE basis) (2021–22)
- Grades: Early Pre-k through 12th grade
- Gender: Coeducational
- Student to teacher ratio: 6.3
- Campus: Suburban
- Campus size: 45 acres (18 ha)
- Colors: Red and blue
- Athletics conference: LHSAA; Northshore Independent Athletic League (NIAL)
- Mascot: Wildcats
- Accreditation: Independent Schools Association of the Southwest; Southwestern Association of Episcopal Schools
- Website: christepiscopalschool.org

Christ Episcopal School is a private, co-educational college preparatory school in St. Tammany Parish, Louisiana, north of New Orleans. Christ Episcopal School is affiliated with Christ Episcopal Church.

The preschool and kindergarten are in the Covington city limits. The grade 1-12 center is in an unincorporated area, with a Covington post office address.

== History ==
Christ Episcopal School was founded in 1984. The first high school class graduated in 2013.

== Academics ==
Christ Episcopal teaches students in grades early pre-kindergarten through 12th grade, and is organized into the Early Childhood Campus, Lower School, Junior High, and High School.

The school is a member of the Independent Schools Association of the Southwest.

== Athletics ==
Christ Episcopal won its first state title in 2017 as the girls Cross Country LHSAA Class C champion.

In 2018, the Christ Episcopal girls basketball team won the division V state championship in its first year of LHSAA competition. Later in 2018, the Christ Episcopal girls track and field team won the LHSAA Class C state championship.

In the Fall of 2018, Christ Episcopal won its first state title in a boys sport when it became the LHSAA Class C Cross Country champion. At the same meet Christ Episcopal successfully defended its girls Cross County LHSAA Class C state championship.

In May 2019 Christ Episcopal defended its LHSAA Class C state championship in girls Track & Field.

== Student life ==
=== Outdoor education ===
The wilderness education has a week-long trip to Yosemite National Park in high school.

=== Fine arts ===
- In February 2019 Christ Episcopal produced Mary Poppins
- Christ Episcopal staged an original adaptation of Mary Shelley's Frankenstein in 2017.
- In October 2018, the Theater department staged an adaptation of "The Crucible" by Arthur Miller
- In November 2019, the Theater department staged an adaptation of "Sense and Sensibility" by Jane Austen

=== Clubs and organizations ===
- Speech and Debate
- Quiz Bowl

== Campus facilities ==
- Reily Academic & Athletic Complex, Dathel Fine Arts Center
- William A. Copeland III Memorial Tennis Center

== Notable alumni ==
- Addison Riecke
