= Lakehill Preparatory School =

Location
- 2720 Hillside Dr; Dallas, Texas 75214; United States; 32.822763°N 96.749246°W

Information
- Type: Private school
- Established: 1971
- NCES School ID: A1399023
- Principal: Dr. Greg Chalfin
- Faculty: 46.3
- Grades: K-12
- Enrollment: 400 (2016)
- Website: www.lakehillprep.org
- Last updated: 1 July 2024

Lakehill Preparatory School is a college preparatory school in the Lakewood, Dallas, Texas neighborhood. The school is accredited through a number of bodies including the Texas Private School Accreditation Commission, which works through the State Commissioner of Education. Currently, the school is accredited by the Independent Schools Association of the Southwest (ISAS), and is a member of the National Association of Independent schools (NAIS). During the 2011-2012 school year, the enrollment at Lakehill was 380 students.

== History ==
The school was founded in 1971, around the time Dallas Independent School District began desegregation busing.

Bernard Fulton was headmaster from 1976-1978. He was a progressive educator, having founded the Greenhill School and serving as its headmaster for twenty-five years.

== Campus ==
The main campus is located on Hillside Drive in the heart of Lakewood. The campus sits on 6 acres (2.4 ha) and houses classrooms, a gymnasium, an auditorium, two libraries, multiple science and computer labs, and the Charles J. Wyly, Jr. Auditorium. The 17-acre (6.9 ha) Roger L. Perry Campus is located just four miles (6 km) from the Main Campus. Built in 2001, this campus is home to the Warrior Athletic Complex and the Alice and Erle Nye Family Environmental Science Center. The Environmental Center offers meeting spaces, classrooms, and laboratories. The Warrior Athletic Complex offers a football stadium, baseball field, softball field, four tennis courts, and a field house. Athletic events, off-season training, and extracurricular activities are held at the Warrior Complex throughout the year. In September 2009, Lakehill opened the Alice and Erle Nye Family Environmental Science Center, a 6,500-square-foot (600 m^{2}) silver LEED certified building.

On March 1, 2009, a fire broke out in the school's gym, rendering it unusable. A new gym was opened in September 2009.

In 2017, the school debuted significant enhancements to the Main Campus, adding 16,000 square feet (1,500 m^{2}) of new space, and 8,000 square feet (740 m^{2}) of renovated space. The additions include new lab spaces for science, writing, and computer science, as well as a new art studio. New classrooms, administrative offices, and meeting and event rooms were also added, along with a new inner courtyard.

== Athletics ==
Lakehill offers baseball, basketball, cross country, football, soccer, golf, rowing/crew, swimming, tennis, track, and volleyball to students in grades 7-12. Cheerleading is also offered from the sixth grade through high school. The teams usually compete in division 1 football and TAPPS.

== Arts ==
Lakehill offers Choir, Theater, Musical Theater, and Visual Arts, such as Drawing, Painting, and Sculpture. Performances are held in the 560-seat Charles J. Wyly auditorium.
