= Granada Theater (Dallas) =

Theatre in Dallas, Texas

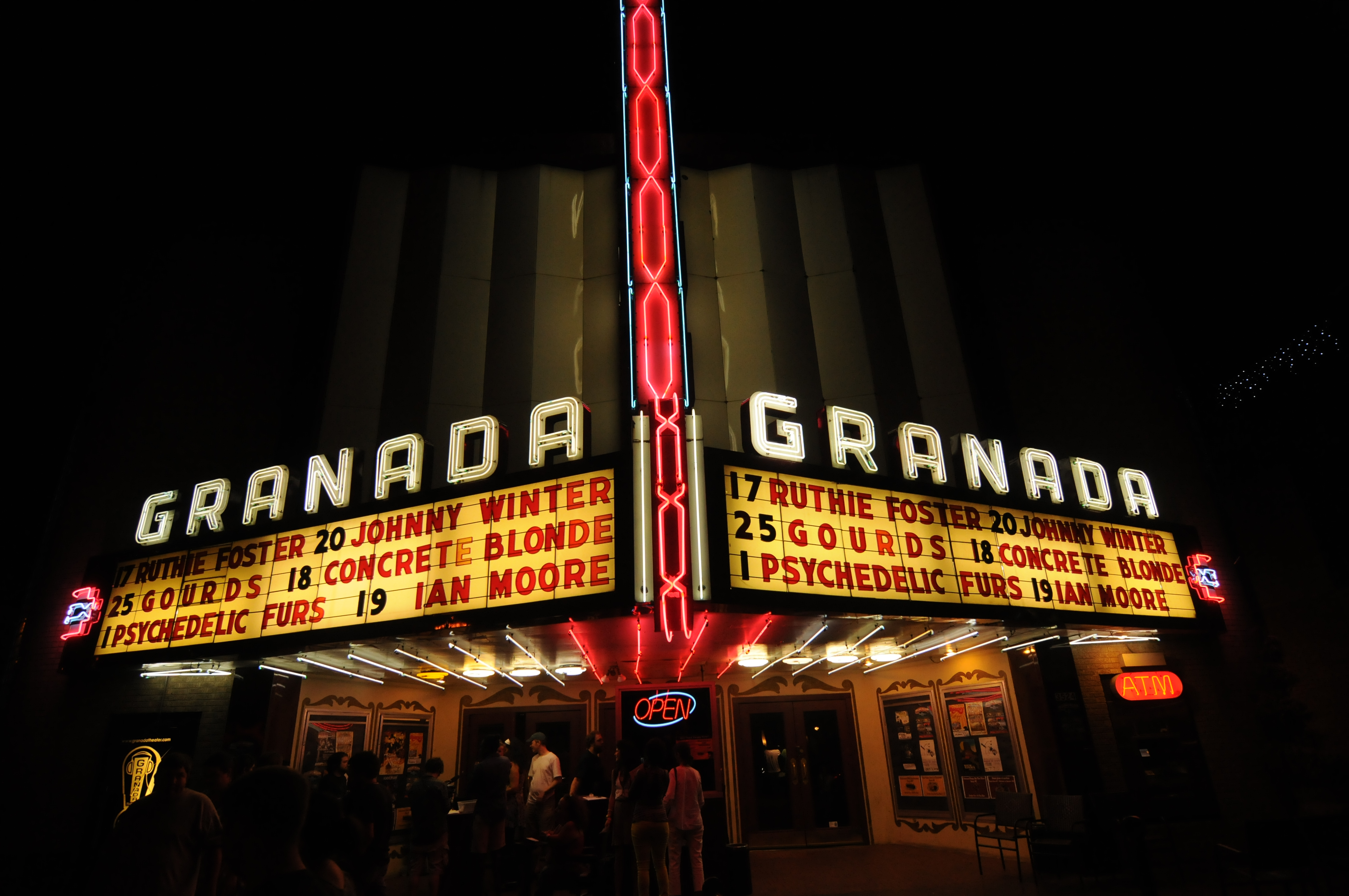
- Exterior of venue
- Interactive map of Granada Theater
- Address: 3524 Greenville Ave. Dallas, TX 75206-5630
- Coordinates: 32.830702°N 96.770024°W
- Capacity: 1,000
- Current use: Concert venue

Construction
- Opened: 1946
- Architect: Raymond F. Smith

Website
- granadatheater.com

The Granada Theater is a theater in the Lower Greenville neighborhood of Dallas. The theater was built in 1946 as a movie house. In 1977, it was converted to a concert hall, only to revert to a movie theater soon afterwards. In 2004 it was again opened as a concert hall.

== Design ==
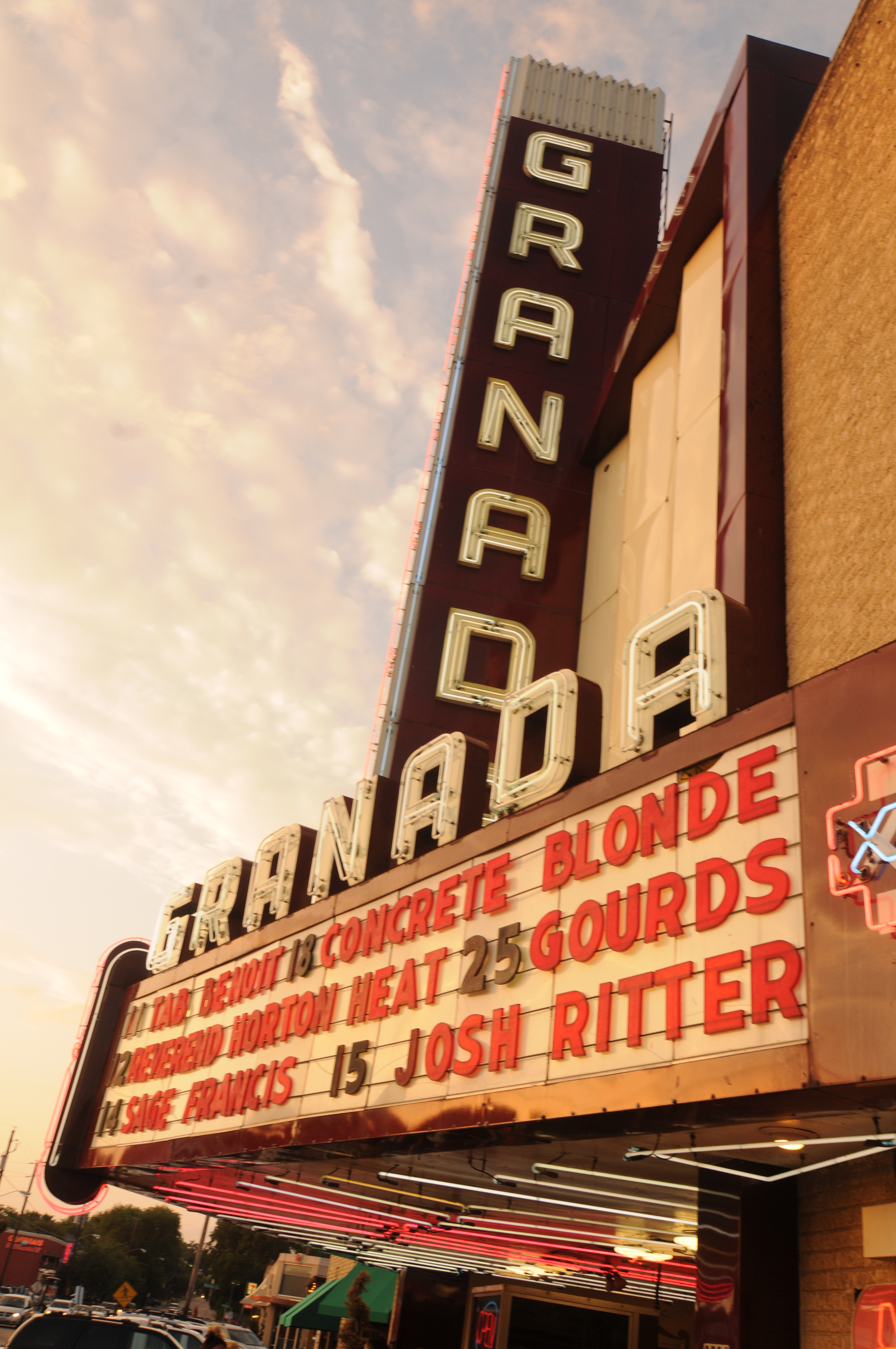
Marquee, 2010

The Art Deco design of the Granada reflects the decadence of the Golden Era. The exterior was designed for function with rounded corners, stepped forms and linear accents that echoed the industrialized, streamlined designs of modern machinery, like automobiles. The interior decor employs the influence of ancient cultures. The murals were designed by the artist(s) who also worked on Los Angeles’ famous Grauman's Chinese Theatre. The grand scale murals depict different genres of film with the ceiling feature depicting a mythological "film goddess" standing over a reel of film, which is fitting since the Greeks started theater. The sunburst crowning the goddess and the curved plaster moldings lining the sidewalls point to another Deco theme–designs taken from nature. The neighborhood theater was family friendly providing soundproof rooms available for mothers with crying children. Archives say that the theater was predominantly dark red, and the original front doors were made of wood.

- 1974-5: Ben Cammack ran the theatre as a revival film house for 10 months before it began showing adult films.
- 1977: John Carruth made the flip from movie theater to music hall with the extension of the stage and the addition of lighting and sound systems. Storerooms behind the screens became dressing rooms, the concession stand now served drinks, and the crying room turned into a private party area.
- 1981: Murals in the lobby were painted by James Franklin, who was hired by then owner Louis Stool.
- 1987: John Appleton and Keith McKeague completed the last interior overhaul including taking out theater seating, terracing the sloping floor and adding tables to the floor plan for food service. They changed the auditorium colors to the present green and gold, preserving and highlighting the details in the original murals.
- 2001: Pat Snuffer kept the features intact with the addition of black decoration.
- 2004: During the last change in ownership, Mike Schoder hired a local artist to add decorative scrolls to the entrance doors and poster boxes. Special attention was given to the lobby lighting, enlivening the existing murals and decor.
- 2010: AC and lobby renovations were completed along with the installation of HD projectors in 2011.

== Awards ==
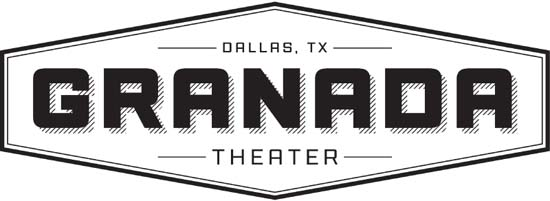
Current logo

Throughout the years Granada Theater has won many awards:

- Best Live Music Venue: 2007-10, 2015, Dallas Observer Awards
- Top 10 Cultural Destinations: 2008, Modern Luxury Dallas, Best of the City
- Nightlife Winner: 2007, Citysearch.com Best of City Search
- Best Live Music Venue: 2011-12, D Magazine Best of Big D
