= Bosque School =

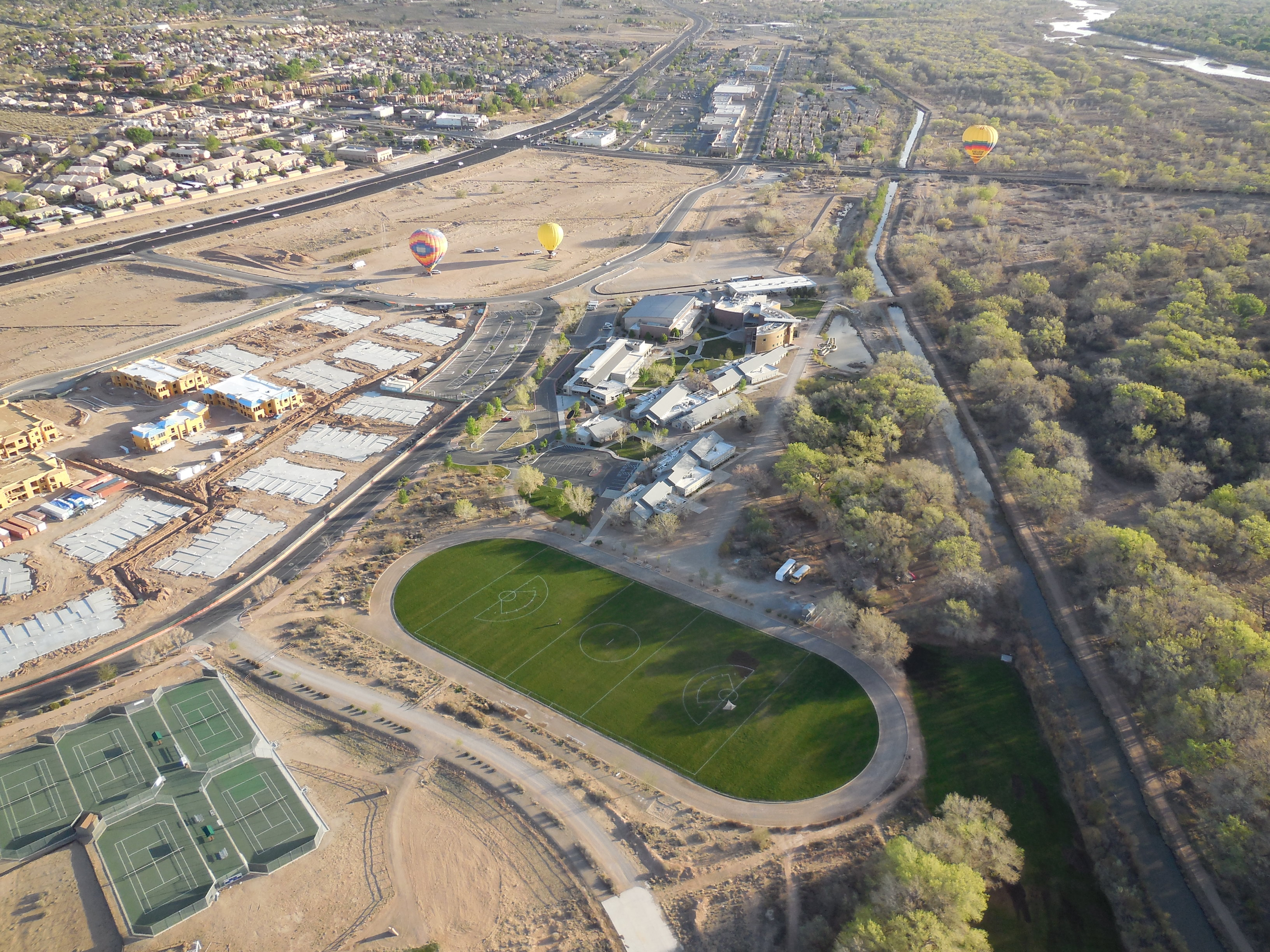
- An aerial view of the school. Pictured also is a partial view of the proximate riparian forest or "bosque".
- 4000 Bosque School Rd. NW; Albuquerque, New Mexico 87120; United States

Information
- Type: Private, Grades 6–12
- Established: 1994
- Head of school: Dr. Jessie Barrie
- Faculty: 70
- Enrollment: 550
- Color: Primary: Blue White Secondary: Orange Green Retired: Tan
- Mascot: bobcat
- Nickname: "Bosque" "Bosque Prep"
- Website: www.bosqueschool.org

Bosque School is an independent, co-educational, college preparatory school for grades 6–12 founded in 1994. The school sits on a 42 acres (170,000 m^{2}) site along the Rio Grande bosque in Albuquerque, New Mexico. Surrounded by the riparian forest of the bosque, the school emphasizes environmental science, the arts, and service learning. With 384 students and 60 teaching faculty, there is a 6:1 student/faculty ratio. An average class size at Bosque School is 14 students. The school is accredited by the Independent Schools Association of the Southwest and is a member of NAIS, NACAC, NMAA, APIAL and other associations. Bosque School was voted the #1 private school in Albuquerque by the 2020 Albuquerque Journal Reader's Choice Awards. The annual summer camp program at the school, Bosque Summer, was voted #1 at the same awards.

== History ==
Bosque School was established in 1994. Dr. Gary Gruber was appointed as the first principal.

In August 1995, Bosque Preparatory School opened in a rented space in Albuquerque's Northeast Heights with 72 sixth and seventh grade students and Dr. Gary Gruber as its first school principal.

In 1996, the Bosque Ecosystem Monitoring Program (BEMP) began as a collaboration between the Biology Department of the University of New Mexico and the Black Institute for Environmental Studies at Bosque School.

In 1998, President Gerald R. Ford and his family assisted in launching the school's first capital campaign, through which almost $1 million was secured to begin construction on a permanent site.

On March 28, 1999, permanent site construction started alongside the bosque.

In 2000, Bosque School relocated to a new campus at Coors and Montano, NW, near to a 100-acre forest. The campus was created with three structures and a gym bubble.

In spring 2001, Bosque School's first senior class graduated with eleven students.

On October 25, 2001, Bosque School dedicated two newly constructed buildings to the Peggie Ann Findlay Performing Arts Center and the Gerald and Betty Ford Library. The arts center name reflects one of the school founders' Dr. Findlay’s appreciation for the theater and fine arts. The Gerald and Betty Ford Library was named after the 38th president and first lady of the United States, who were also the school supporters.

In 2004, a 10,000-square-foot science building was given to the school. The Montano Bridge interpretive art panels, built by architect Robert Peters, featuring Bosque student artwork and Spanish translations, have been presented. The same year, intercultural exchange with Reina Elizabeth College in Mexico City started.

In 2006, during the tenth year of Bosque School, the Budagher family donated $3 million to expand the arts center, adding 15,500 square feet of space for dining, a performance hall, and art classrooms. On April 10, 2006, Bosque School started construction of Budagher Hall.

In 2011, the school created the Alumni Walkway, which allows graduates to leave their imprint with a personalized brick.

In 2013, a team of Bosque School senior students led by Satwest President Brian Barnett sent the first commercial text message to space using a Satwest satellite phone inside one of eight payloads carried by the UP Aerospace SpaceLoft 8 rocket. The flight was funded by NASA's Flight Opportunities Program.

In 2019, Dr. Jessie Barrie was appointed as the fourth principal of Bosque School.

== Curriculum ==
When students enter middle school (6th–8th grades) at Bosque, they take a full schedule of required courses including English, Spanish, Math, Social Studies, Science, fine art, performing art, service learning, and physical education. As students enter the upper school (9th–12th grades), they are required to take four years of English, four years of History, three-four years of science, three-four years of math, two years of Spanish, two years of performing or fine art, four years of service learning, and two years of physical education or equivalent interscholastic athletics. Upper School students are also required to take a college seminar course and complete a college level year long senior thesis.

== College Matriculation ==
Since its first graduating class in 2001, one-hundred percent of all Bosque students have matriculated to college receiving, on average, $12,000 in merit scholarships. Bosque alumni are currently attending colleges and universities across the United States and abroad. Of the school's 60 graduating seniors in the class of 2019, students matriculated to over 30 schools, including: Stanford University, the University of Chicago, Pomona College, Bob Jones University, Northwestern University, University of California, Berkeley, Barnard College, Bryn Mawr College, Rice University, Georgetown University and Washington University in St. Louis.

== Bosque Ecosystem Monitoring Program (BEMP) ==
Given its location in a vast environmental ecosystem, the school focusses on land stewardship through its Black Institute for Environmental Studies Programs include: the Bosque Ecosystem Monitoring Program (BEMP), The Cebrin Goodman Youth Leadership and the Environment Project, citizen science, and wildlife conservation.

== Campus ==
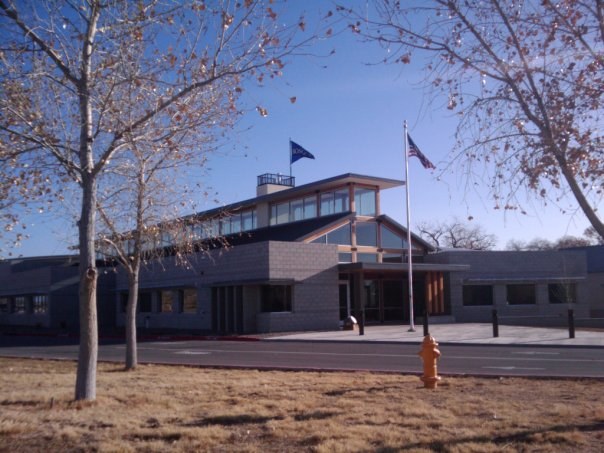
A view of the "Schoolhouse", taken from the west. Designed by architecture firm RMKM, this building is lauded for its modern masonry "projecting a bold symbol of educational excellence".

The campus sits on 23 acres of land directly adjacent to the riparian forest supported by the Rio Grande. It has numerous buildings, including: Peggie Ann Findlay Performing Arts Center, Budagher Hall, Upper and Middle School Buildings, a gymnasium, the Gerald Ford Library, and the 15,500 square foot "Schoolhouse".

=== Archeology On Campus ===
During an expansion project in early 2007, an ancient Native American pueblo was found on the southern end of the campus. To preserve this archaeological discovery, the tennis courts and the Klaus Weber Championship Soccer Field were moved slightly to preserve the land. This ancient pueblo site is used as an educational resource in history classes.

== Controversy ==
In 2024, an article by the local chapter of the ACLU accused the school of "discrimination and systemic racism", leading to a toxic learning environment. The school's former Director of Equity, Community, and Culture described how the school had a high turnover of students and faculty of color and how former students described experiences of racism on campus. The ACLU article alleges that the school actively undermined the Director's attempts to do her job and retaliated against her, leading to her eventually leaving her job.

== Notable alumni ==
- Forrest Goodluck, actor
