= Albuquerque Academy =

Independent school in New Mexico, US

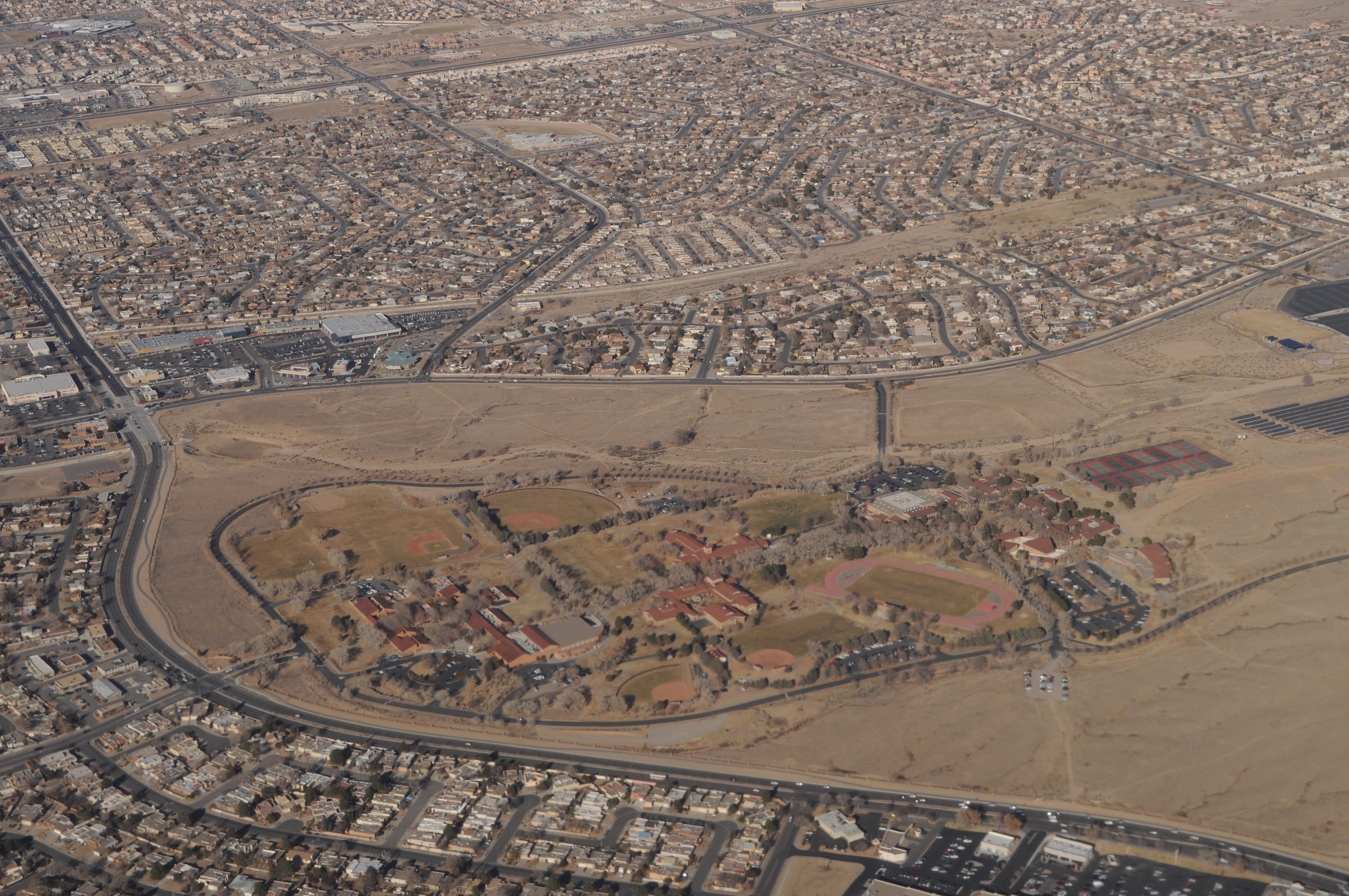
- Aerial view of Albuquerque Academy in 2013

Location
- 6400 Wyoming Blvd. NE; Albuquerque, New Mexico 87109; United States; 35.151944444444°N 106.55222222222°W

Information
- Type: Independent, Private
- Motto: Scientia ad faciendum (Knowledge for the sake of doing)
- Established: 1955
- Head of school: Julianne Puente
- Faculty: 174
- Grades: 6-12
- Enrollment: 1,195 (2024-25)
- Colors: Red; Black
- Athletics conference: NMAA, AAAA Dist. 5
- Mascot: Charger
- Newspaper: The Academy Advocate
- Endowment: $92.5 million (2024)
- Tuition: $28,149
- Website: www.aa.edu

Albuquerque Academy is an independent, co-educational day school for grades 6-12 in Albuquerque, New Mexico. The school is accredited by the Independent Schools Association of the Southwest and the New Mexico State Department of Education, and is also a member of the National Association of Independent Schools.

The school has routinely ranked among the top 200 private high schools in the United States, peaking at #5 in 2015. Albuquerque Academy comprises three different divisions (groups of grade levels): the 6-7 division, the 8-9 division, and the 10-12 division.

== History ==
Albuquerque Academy was founded in 1955 as The Academy for Boys in the basement of a small Albuquerque church by William B. S. Wilburn. The school was eventually moved into a facility that is today used by Sandia Preparatory School. In 1965, the school moved to its current site in northeast Albuquerque.

Between 1957 and 1964, the academy received a large tract of undeveloped land north of Albuquerque, part of the Elena Gallegos Land Grant, from the Albert G. Simms family. The western portion (from Wyoming Boulevard to the Rio Grande) was sold to finance the creation of the current campus and the first endowment fund, and the present campus was created in the middle of the tract. The land east of the campus, reaching the crest of the Sandia Mountains, was sold later in a series of deals. First, the section from the campus to Juan Tabo Boulevard was sold to create a second trust. Later, the City of Albuquerque attempted to facilitate a deal to sell the remainder to the Bureau of Land Management by putting up a parking garage as collateral. The deal fell through, and the academy became the garage owner while still retaining the area.

In July 1982, the city purchased most of the land in a complex deal with the academy and the US Forest Service. The City paid the academy $23.9 million, raised by a bond issue supported by a temporary ¼ percent sales tax. The City retained part of the land, which is now the 640-acre (260 ha) Elena Gallegos Picnic Area/Albert G. Simms Park, located at the feet of the Sandias at the mouths of Bear and Pino Canyons. The 7,000-acre (2,800 ha) plus remainder of the purchase, most of it forest land in the canyons proper, was sold to the Forest Service and is now part of the Cibola National Forest and the Sandia Mountain Wilderness. The academy retained two parts of the tract, the larger adjoining Tramway Boulevard. The school set up the High Desert Investment Corporation (HDIC) to develop this portion as the master-planned community known as High Desert. (The smaller portion, within Bear Canyon itself, is still used by the academy for experiential education purposes.) HDIC then purchased a large tract of land in the northern section of Rio Rancho, developed as Mariposa.

The school remained an all-boys school, with grades five through 12, until 1973, at which time girls were allowed into grades nine through 12. Part of the reason for the delay in allowing girls and for the gradual inclusion was that the Simms grant specified that the number of boys not decrease in order to make room for girls. The fifth grade was dropped in 1979, and the school became fully coeducational in 1984.

=== Heads of school ===
- William B. S. Wilburn, 1955–60
- Rev. Paul G. Saunders, 1960–64
- Ashby Harper, 1964–85
- Robert L. Bovinette, 1985–96
- Timothy R. McIntire, 1996–99
- Donald W. Smith (interim head), 1999–2001
- Andrew T. Watson, 2001–2020
- Julianne Puente, 2020–present

== Extracurricular activities ==
Extracurricular activities at the school include state championship sports teams, The Advocate (a student newsmagazine that has received numerous awards from the Albuquerque Tribune and the New Mexico Press Women), Science Olympiad, Science Bowl, and theater.

The longest sports state championship streaks by Academy sports teams are the 21-time defending state champion boys tennis team (2003–present); the eight-time defending state champion girls swim team (2007–present); and the six-time state champion boys basketball team (1989–1994), boys swim team (2006–2011), and boys track team (2002–2007).

The swim teams have won 48 combined state titles (24 for the boys, 24 for the girls).

The school's mock trial team won the 2012 National High School Mock Trial Championship, marking the first time a New Mexican team had won the title, and the first time a team from the host state had won. In 2013, the team won the national championship again, which was only the third time in tournament history that a school won twice in a row. The program has qualified at least one team for state competition every year since the program was rebooted in 2005. In 2016, the team finished 4th in the national competition held in Boise, ID. In 2019, Academy's mock trial team placed sixth at the National High School Mock Trial Championship. In 2021, the Academy's mock trial team placed third at the National High School Mock Trial Championship. And in 2022 the team placed seventh in the nation as well. In 2023 the Academy's mock trial team took second at the National High School Mock Trial Championship.

In May 2010, the school's Science Bowl team won the US DOE Middle School Science Bowl competition in Washington, DC.

In the spring of 2006, the orchestra, the Chamber Players, was invited to attend the National Orchestra Festival in Kansas City, Missouri

=== Sports State Championships ===
The Academy has won a number of state championships.

Table of State Championships
Season	Sport	Number of Championships	Year	
Fall	Football	0		
Fall	Boys' Cross Country	15	1995, 1998, 1999, 2000, 2001, 2002, 2004, 2005, 2006, 2008, 2009, 2010, 2015, 2016, 2017	
Fall	Girls' Cross Country	7	1993, 2005, 2008, 2016, 2017, 2018, 2023	
Fall	Boys' Soccer	14	1976, 1978, 1979, 1980, 1983, 1984, 1999, 2000, 2001, 2015, 2016, 2018, 2020 (in 2021), 2021	
Fall	Girls' Soccer	11	2000, 2001, 2002, 2008, 2009, 2010, 2011, 2012, 2016, 2017, 2018	
Fall	Volleyball	2	1998, 2020 (in 2021)	
Winter	Boys' Basketball	10	1968, 1981, 1984, 1989, 1990, 1991, 1992, 1993, 1994, 2023	
Winter	Girls' Basketball	0		
Winter	Boys' Swimming	24	1972, 1973, 1975, 1985, 1986, 1989, 1992, 1994, 1995, 1997, 1999, 2000, 2001, 2002, 2003, 2006, 2007, 2008, 2009, 2010, 2011, 2015, 2016, 2017	
Winter	Girls' Swimming	24	1986, 1987, 1989, 1990, 1991, 1994, 2000, 2002, 2003, 2005, 2006, 2007, 2009, 2010, 2011, 2012, 2017, 2018, 2019, 2020, 2021, 2022, 2023, 2024	
Winter	Wrestling	5	1969, 1977, 1978, 1979, 1983	
Spring	Baseball	5	1998, 1999, 2009, 2015, 2021	
Spring	Boys' Golf	11	1975, 1990, 1997, 2003, 2008, 2009, 2014, 2015, 2021, 2022, 2024	
Spring	Girls' Golf	7	1993, 1995, 2015, 2021, 2022, 2023, 2024	
Spring	Softball	0		
Spring	Boys' Track	17	1991, 1996, 1999, 2002, 2003, 2004, 2005, 2006, 2007, 2009, 2010, 2012, 2015, 2016, 2017, 2018, 2019	
Spring	Girls' Track	8	1993, 2002, 2005, 2006, 2007, 2017, 2018, 2019	
Spring	Boys' Tennis	27	1993, 1995, 1998, 1999, 2000, 2001, 2003, 2004, 2005, 2006, 2007, 2008, 2009, 2010, 2011, 2012, 2013, 2014, 2015, 2016, 2017, 2018, 2019, 2021, 2022, 2023, 2024	
Spring	Girls' Tennis	13	1994, 1995, 1996, 1997, 1998, 2005, 2006, 2016, 2019, 2021, 2022, 2023, 2024	
Spring	Total		200	Totals current through Spring 2024

== Notable faculty ==
- Dave Barney (born 1932), swimming coach from 1967 to 2021, English teacher from 1967 to 1995
- Jason Zuffranieri, math teacher from 2013 to 2022, 19-time Jeopardy champ

== Notable alumni ==
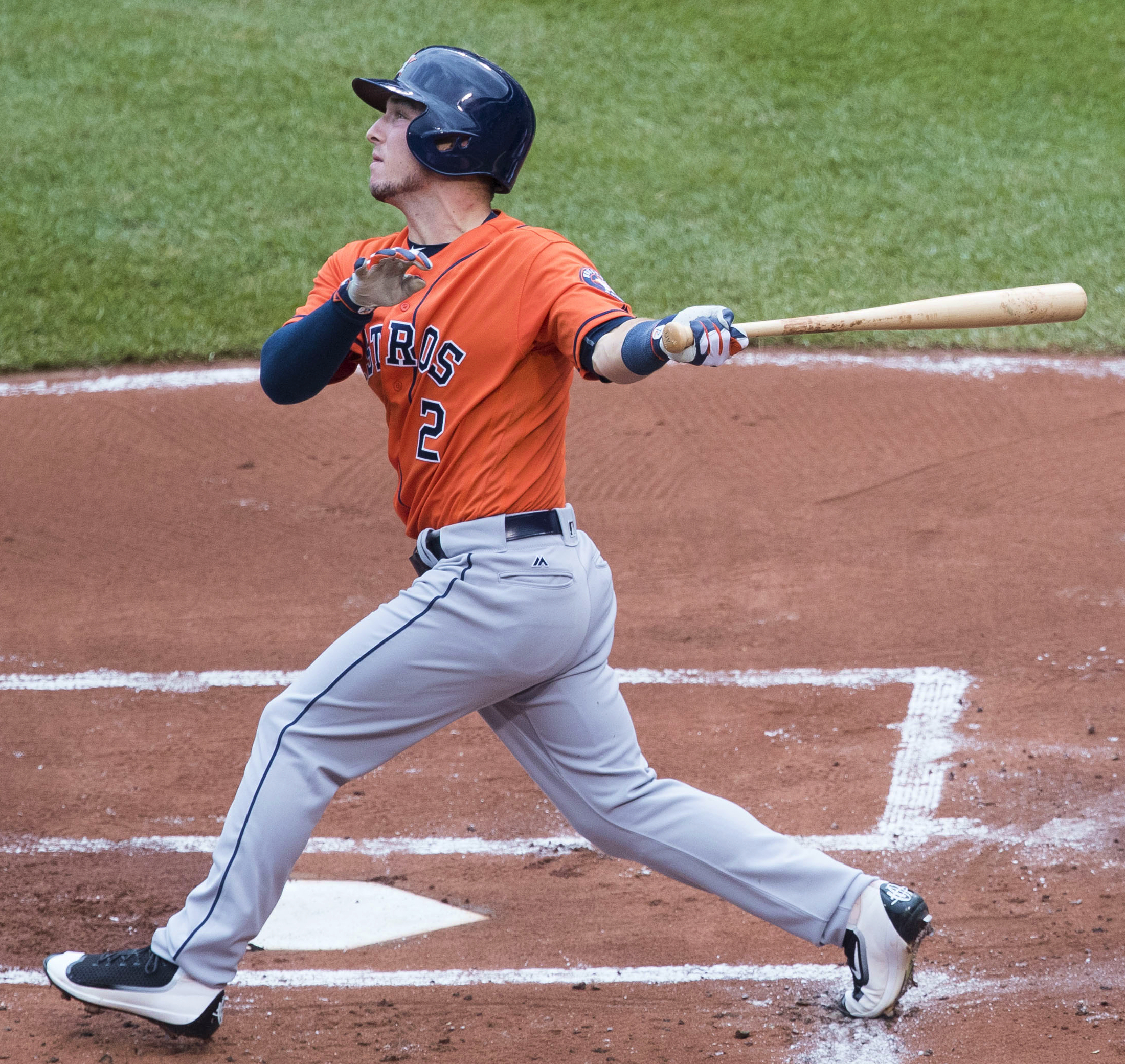
Alex Bregman

- Kyle Altman (born 1986), soccer player
- Anika Apostalon, professional swimmer
- Norman Bay, former US Attorney and former head of the FERC Office of Enforcement
- Curtis Beach (born 1990), decathlete
- Notah Begay III, professional golfer
- James Borrego, NBA basketball coach
- Alex Bregman, professional MLB player
- R. Martin Chavez, investment banker
- Brian Conrey, mathematician
- David Eagleman (born 1971), neuroscientist, writer, podcaster
- Kate Gallego, mayor of Phoenix
- Rebecca Gibel, actress
- Mira Jacob, novelist
- Victor Milán (class of 1972), science fiction writer
- Joshua Cooper Ramo, journalist and businessman
- Rachel Smolkin, journalist
- Cody Toppert, basketball player and coach
- Chainey Umphrey, Olympic gymnast
