= Lakewood Theater (Dallas) =

Coordinates: 32.811913°N 96.753218°W

Image of the Lakewood Theater (Dallas)

The Lakewood Theater was a historic theater located in Lakewood, Dallas, Texas (USA). The restored Streamline Moderne theater, built in 1938, showed classic films and hosted many contemporary musical and comedy events. The theater closed in 2015.
