= Headwaters School =

Private school in Austin, Texas, United States

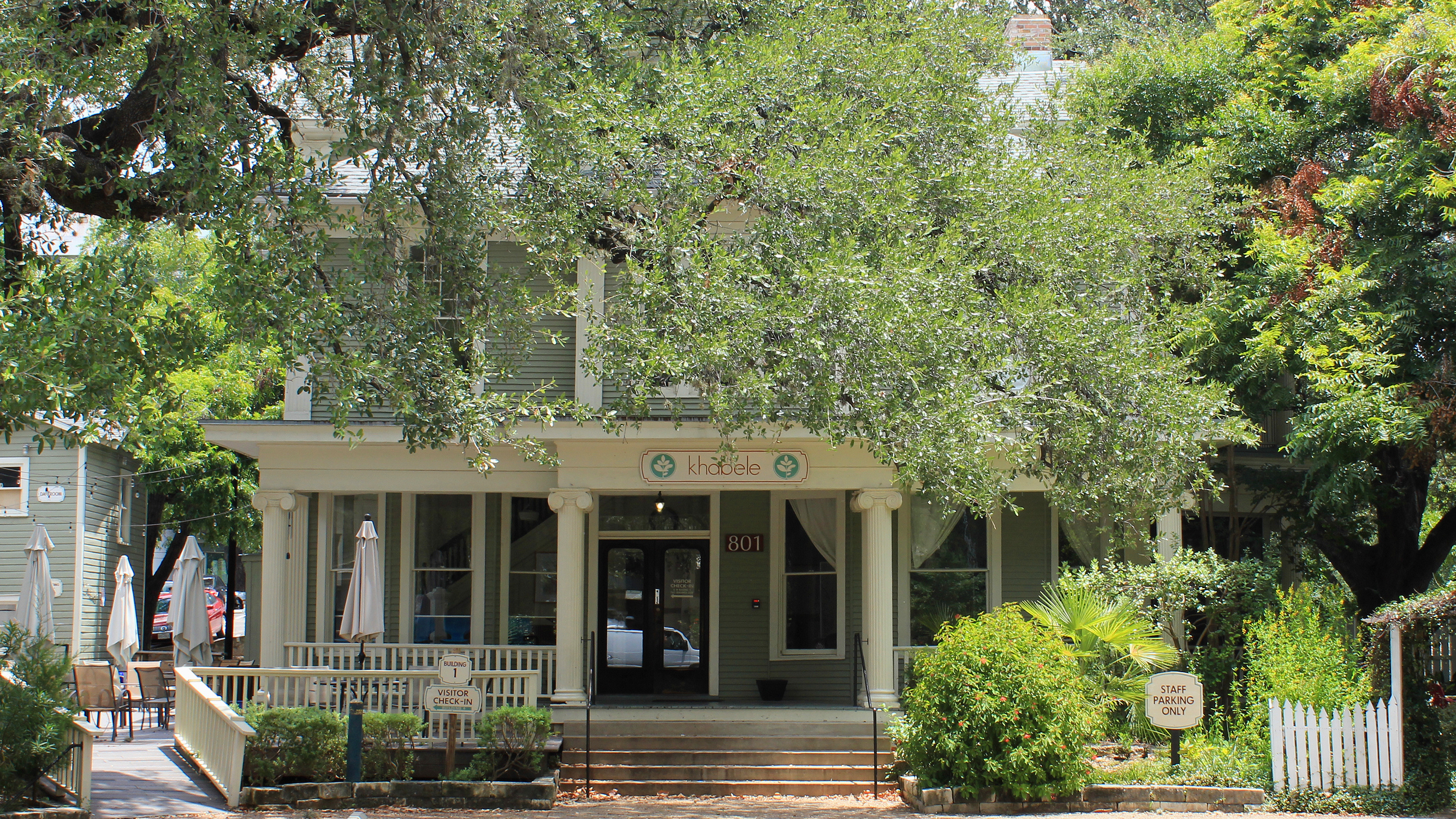
Khabele School Rio Grande Campus Building 1

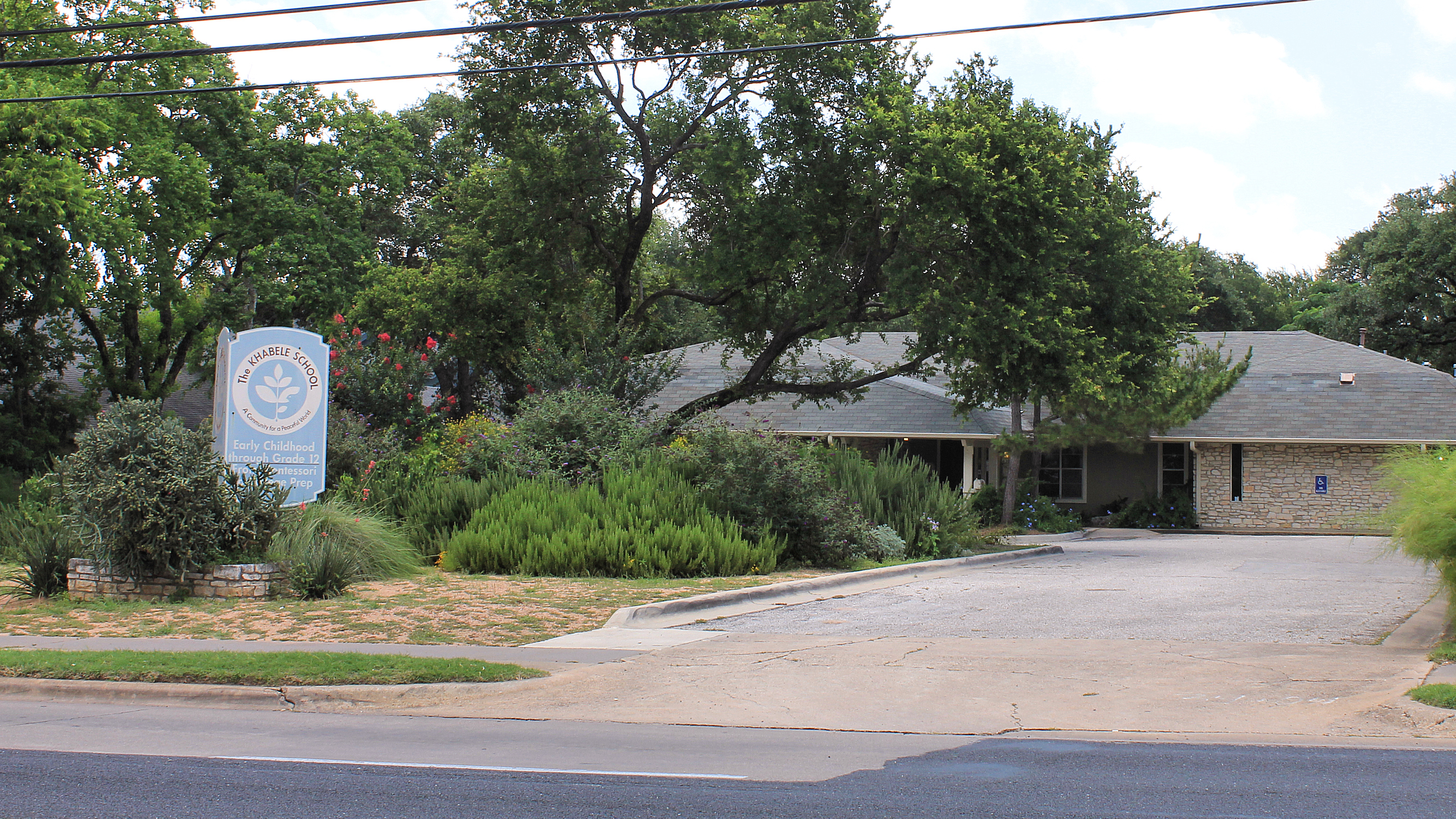
Khabele School Manchaca Road campus

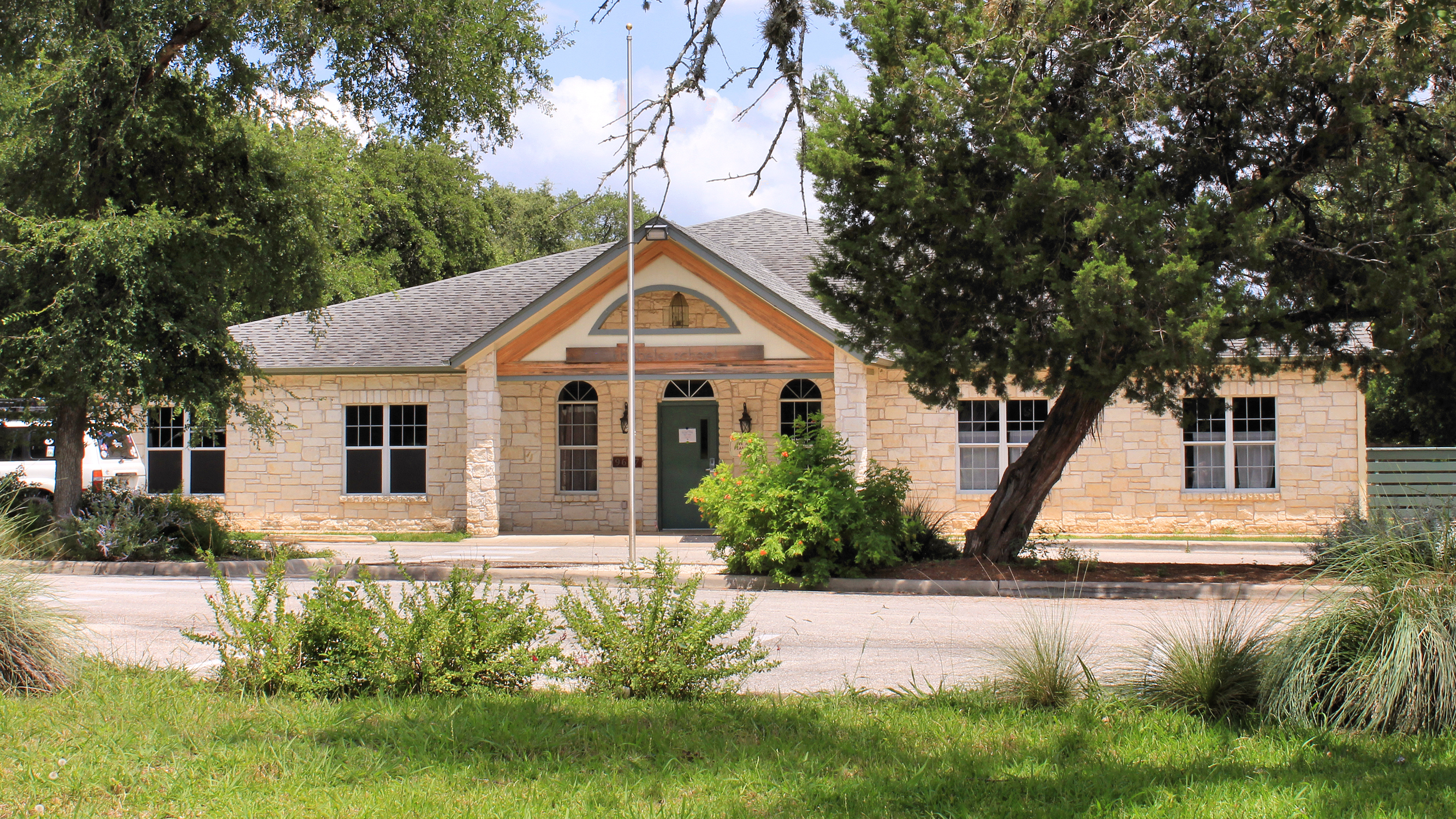
Khabele School Brodie Lane Campus

The Headwaters School, formerly Khabele School until 2016, is an early childhood through 12th grade private school located in Austin, Texas. It re-branded as Headwaters School in 2016. It begins with a Montessori foundation and progresses to the International Baccalaureate Diploma Programme. It has three campuses, with the Middle & High School Campus in Downtown Austin serving grades 6 through 12, the Elementary Campus on Brodie Lane serving grades Kindergarten through 5, and the Early Childhood Campus on Manchaca Road serving ages 18 months through preschool.

== History ==
Letsie "Khotso" Khabele, Jennifer "Moya" Khabele, Lisa Dubuque, and Hector Perez co-founded the school. At the time Khotso and Jennifer Khabele were a married couple. Khotso Khabele is the grandson of Bertha Sadler Means, an Austin activist during the Civil Rights Movement. Michael Barnes of the Austin American-Statesman said that "[t]he idea for the school grew out of a national crisis". Khotso Khabele said he considered "How do I raise my child in this new world? How do I educate kids for this new, rapidly changing world? We got clear that we wanted to lean into change."

The school opened in 2001 with 9 students. The Khabele couple had started the school six months after the two first met. The school initially used a borrowed classroom, in North Austin. In 2007 the school acquired an annex at 701 W. 7th St. and housed dance, martial arts, music, and yoga classes there. In 2008 the school had 170 students.

In 2011 Khabele merged with Primavera Montessori, a South Austin private school for 18-month-old to 1st grade children. Primavera; established by Maria Claus, John Martin, Jennifer Phillips, and Jennifer Tyson; had opened in October 2002, with 15 students. As of 2012 the Khabele School had 101 employees and a yearly budget of $6 million. By 2012 it had signed a one-year lease for the facility that houses the elementary division. After that point, the school had the possibility of renewing the lease or constructing a new facility. As of January 2013 the school had three campuses with a total of 460 students. Barnes said in 2013 that the "globally themed" school had "grown rapidly".

In 2014, the former co-founders, Jennifer "Moya" Khabele, and Letsie James "Khotso" Khabele, were sued by the then-current leadership, which accused them of charging the school two to three times the fair market value for its downtown location from 2006 to 2013. The suit claimed that the pair overcharged the school over $1 million. Circa 2014, "Khotso" co-founded a school called "Khabele + Strong Incubator". The board of the Khabele School, in the lawsuit papers, argued that the establishment of the new school harmed The Khabele School and caused confusion in that school's image.

Ted Graf became the head of school in July 2015. Its new name was effective 2016. Graf, the principal, stated that the school was planning to get a new name since the merger as it needed to solidify its identity. In regards to the new name Graf stated "We felt like Headwaters, metaphorically, was this notion that educational journeys of the self begin at this primal spot, and we felt like Headwaters and all the imagery and language that comes with it really expresses what we're trying to do as a school."

== Programs ==
Headwaters Montessori Early Childhood program is located on the Springs Campus at 6305 Menchaca Road. This program is for children from 18 months to about 2–3 years of age in the Young Children's Casita (YCC) and for children ages 2.5–6 years of age in Primary.

The Montessori Elementary program is located on the Creek Campus at 9607 Brodie Lane. This Montessori program is for children in Kindergarten through 5th grade.

Located in Downtown Austin at 807 Rio Grande Street, the River Campus has the Middle and High School programs. This program is more traditional with block scheduling. Headwaters School is an International Baccalaureate World School offering the Diploma Programme for 11th and 12th grade students.

== Student body ==
As of the 2023–2024 school year, the school had 525 students, with 12% of the student body receiving financial aid. The average financial aid is $7,343.

== Governance ==
Headwaters School is a 501(c)(3) non-profit organization and is overseen by a board of trustees. The Board serves without compensation.

== Curriculum ==
The K-5th grade is Montessori. The high school is part of the IBO program for juniors and seniors.

As of 2007, students at the school do charitable acts for one week in the month of December.
