= Sandia Preparatory School =

High school in Albuquerque, New Mexico

Coordinates: 35°09′00″N 106°37′05″W

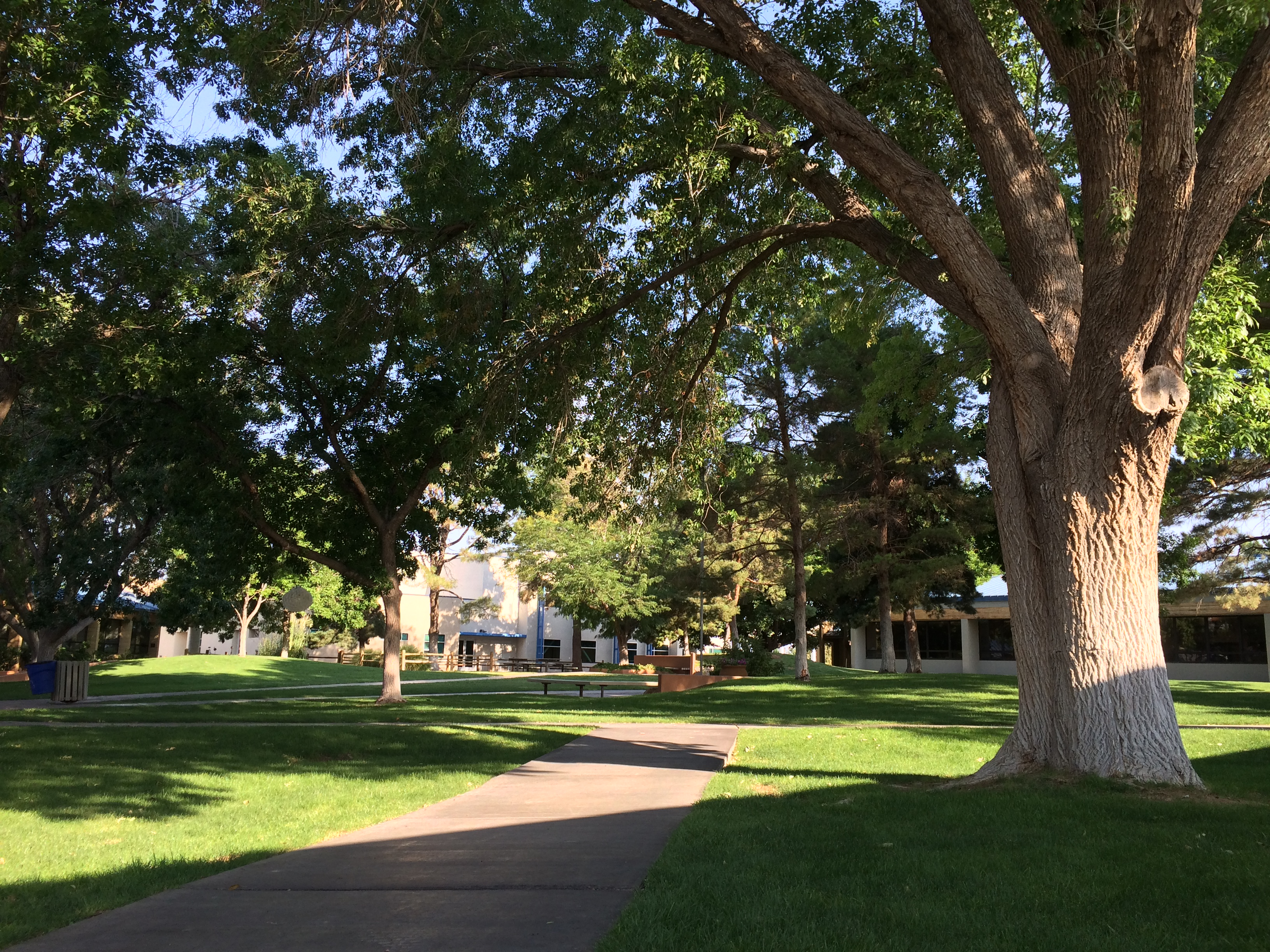

Location
- 532 Osuna Rd NE; Albuquerque, New Mexico 87113; United States

Information
- Type: Independent
- Motto: Constant Possum
- Established: 1966
- Headmaster: Scott Jeffries
- Faculty: 75
- Grades: 6-12
- Enrolment: 513 (2024-2025)
- Average class size: 15
- Student to teacher ratio: 7:1
- Campus: Suburban
- Campus size: 33 acres
- Colors: Athletic Colors: Cardinal Red; Columbia Blue
- Mascot: Sundevil
- Nickname: Prep
- Accreditation: Independent Schools Association of the Southwest
- Publication: 532 (community magazine); La Chispa (student literary magazine)
- Newspaper: Sandia Prep Times
- Yearbook: Sandglass
- Endowment: $10 million
- Tuition: $23,410 (2021-2022)
- Website: http://www.sandiaprep.org/

Sandia Preparatory School is an independent college preparatory school located in Albuquerque, New Mexico serving students in sixth through twelfth grade. The school is accredited by the Independent Schools Association of the Southwest (ISAS) and the New Mexico Public Education Department, and is a founding member of the Independent Curriculum Group and a member of the National Association of Independent Schools (NAIS).

== History ==
In 1958, Barbara Young Simms began to investigate the possibility of starting a girls day school in Albuquerque. In 1965, she secured land, established a board of trustees, and formed the Sandía School, a nonsectarian school. In late January 1966, the Rev. Paul G. Saunders, an Episcopal priest, was selected headmaster and, later that year, the school opened. The year began with 75 students in grades 5 through 10 (grade 11 was added the next year; grade 12 the year after), and finished with 82 students.

In 1973, Sandía School became coeducational. The school began to refer to itself as Sandia Preparatory School and expanded to a coeducational school during the 1974-75 academic year. Fifth-grade classes were discontinued in the 1985-86 school year.

Since its founding in 1966, Sandia Prep has grown from a girls' school with 82 students in three buildings to a coeducational institution with 670 students at its maximum in buildings and facilities that fill a 30-acre (120,000 m^{2}) campus. The first graduating class in 1969 consisted of six girls and has risen to roughly 80.

Sandia Prep is "descended" from the original Sandía School, a private day and boarding school for girls founded by Ruth Hanna McCormick (Barbara Young Simms’s aunt by marriage) in 1932. In its first year, Sandía School held classes for five students and one teacher in a private house where Manzano Day School is now located. The school was formed in part to help prepare girls for further study or college in the Eastern United States.

In 1937, the school moved to a new permanent campus (now part of Kirtland Air Force Base). Simms commissioned architect John Gaw Meem to design the school complex in the territorial style. By 1938, the school had 75 students, nine of whom were boarders, and 18 faculty. In 1942, due to World War II, Sandía School closed. A number of alumnae from the first Sandía School participated in the organization of the current Sandia Prep School.

=== Heads of School ===
- Rev. Paul G. Saunders, Headmaster 1966-1969
- Orell A. Phillips, Acting Headmaster 1969-1970
- Mose V. Hale, Headmaster 1970-1974
- Elton H. Knutson, Headmaster 1974-1986
- Dick Heath, Headmaster 1986-2010
- Ron Briley, Acting Headmaster 2004-2005
- Steve Albert, Head of School 2010-2014
- Joyce Whelchel, Interim Head of School 2014-2015
- Bill Sinfield, Head of School 2015-2022
- Heather B. Mock, Head of School, 2022-2026
- Scott Jeffries, Head of School, 2026-

== Curriculum ==
Sandia Prep is an independent school and does not accept funding from the district, state, or federal government; therefore, it is not restricted by policies put in place by those entities. The school has developed its own college-prep curriculum as compared to a state-prescribed one. The Class of 2025 had all students be accepted to a college, continuing a trend of 100% college admission rate for the school.

The school's sixth and seventh grades are arranged with an elective rotation cycle which allows students to sample courses in their first two years; classes rotate every quarter. In the upper school (high school grades nine through twelve), English, mathematics, science, history, modern language, arts, digital media and communications, and physical education are all required.

== Facilities ==
Sandia Prep encompasses 33 acres, including 5 sports fields, 6 tennis courts, and a track and soccer stadium. There are 16 campus buildings totalling 171,496 square feet. The buildings include over 50 classrooms and administrative offices, three computer labs, the DesignLab (Prep's makerspace), art studios, a photo lab, the Center for Learning Excellence, the Outdoor Leadership Program, Saunders Library, the Russell Student Center and its cafeteria, the Pitchfork Café, a dance room, a rehearsal room, and the 300+ seat McCall Family Theater which was renovated in the fall of 2018.

Prep completed a renovation of its track and soccer stadium in 2015 and rebuilt its tennis courts in 2021. The school has an additional soccer field, and baseball and softball fields. The campus includes two gyms: the West Gym which seats 600 people and can be configured for four basketball courts or four volleyball courts; and the Field House, built in 2008, which includes the 850-seat gymnasium, a weight room, multipurpose room, locker rooms, offices, and lobby.

== Athletics ==
More than 78% of Prep students play on 54 teams in 22 sports offered. All students from sixth through eighth grade take PE classes as part of their regular schedule.

Beginning in sixth grade, students may participate in:

- Basketball
- Cross Country
- Dance
- Flag Football
- Golf
- Mountain Biking
- Soccer
- Softball
- Tennis
- Track and Field
- Volleyball

Beginning in eighth grade, students may participate in all sports offered to sixth- and seventh-grade students, as well as:

- Baseball
- Bowling
- eSports
- Lacrosse
- Swim

All eighth-grade Sandia Prep students are eligible to participate in upper school athletics, at any level of competition (freshman, c-team, junior varsity, or variety) provided they receive approval from the Sandia Prep Athletic Director and the New Mexico Activities Association.
