= North Lake (Dallas) =

- Location within Texas Location within the United States
- Location: Dallas, Texas, United States
- Coordinates: 32°56′57″N 96°58′19″W
- Type: reservoir
- Primary inflows: South Fork of Grapevine Creek
- Primary outflows: South Fork of Grapevine Creek
- Catchment area: 3 sq mi (7.8 km^{2})
- Basin countries: United States
- Surface area: 800 acres (320 ha)
- Average depth: 21.56 ft (6.57 m)
- Max. depth: 31.2 ft (9.5 m)
- Water volume: 17,000 acre⋅ft (0.021 km^{3})
- Surface elevation: 510 ft (160 m)
- Islands: 3, 1 above surface, 2 submerged
- Settlements: Dallas

North Lake is a reservoir located in Dallas, Texas, 2 miles (3 km) southeast of Coppell. The Cypress Waters business and residential development is on its southern side.

== History ==
The lake area was once a large bowl-like valley that was used for farming. Construction on North Lake Dam began in 1956 and the dam was complete in August 1957. Many of the trees where the lake was to be built were cut down, although a few small structures still exist. The reservoir was designed as a cooling reservoir for a Dallas Power and Light Company electric power plant. At that time, the City of Dallas, Texas annexed the land around the power plant and the lake.

In 1978, the lake began to be used for fishing as well. Fish did not survive well due to low nutrient levels, so in 1978 the Dallas Parks and Recreation Department began fertilizing the water and stocking it with bass. The City of Irving, Texas leased land south of the lake as a park in the 1980s and 1990s. North Lake Park was popular with personal watercraft enthusiasts and provided a runway for radio-controlled aircraft. The owner of the lake, power company TXU, turned down offers in 2000 to sell the land to the cities of Coppell, Texas or Irving, Texas. Irving and Coppell were not willing to fund permanent facilities for the park as TXU granted access to the land only on a short-term lease. The park closed in 2000, ending all recreational use of the lake. The lake was thought to be closed because of a high concentration of amoebas from the temperature of the plant's water output. A small dock and personal watercraft holding area were present in the fifth cove down.

The lake today does not support water sports, boating. Catch and release bank fishing is allowed as long as signage of where you are not allowed to fish is followed.

== Development Controversy ==
The Billingsley Company, a Texas land developer, purchased land south of the lake in 2004. Lucy Billingsley, daughter of Trammell Crow, announced her intention to build up to 10,000 living units on the land. The area is officially in the city of Dallas but is part of the Coppell Independent School District. Officials in Coppell, Texas and Irving, Texas strongly opposed the plan due to increased automobile traffic and the costs of building and maintaining new schools. After three years of litigation, the parties reached a settlement in 2008 that allowed development on the land. Coppell residents approved a bond measure in 2007, part of which would be used to fund the construction of new schools in the area. The Subprime mortgage crisis postponed Billingsley's plans to develop the land until 2013. The lake was drained to about 13 feet deep, significantly reducing its surface area.

Now known as Cypress Waters, the area has experienced rapid business and multi-family residential development. An area on the south shore of the lake is now known as The Sound and features restaurants and a concert amphitheater.

== Dam and reservoir ==
North Lake has an embankment dam, which overflows to a chute spillway. The dam had a leak in the North-east part of the dam, which was later patched. Coppell is lowering the water level, which will permanently stay at about 13 feet after 2012. Behind the dam is a low swamp area and a new residential development zone.

== Islands and water ==
Several islands are located on the lake, however, most of them are submerged at the regular pool level. The largest island, which is above water, has a shoreline of about 325 feet. The bottom of the lake is generally sandy, with some occasional mud. When the park was opened, a large floating water ski ramp was placed in the center of the lake. Several no-ski buoys were placed in the south-west cove because the shallow depth of the cove presented a safety hazard. Some vegetation has been known to be present, although not enough to sustain fish. Coontail (Ceratophyllum demersum) was present at one time, but the sandy bottom made it hard for it to survive. The lake is fed by rain and run-off through the shallow valleys, but mostly by Grapevine Creek, a small stream nearly always flowing into the lake. The stream is located in the south-western cove. The only boat ramp on the lake is on a small road facing Belt Line Rd. The boat ramp had to be discontinued because of the uneven surface of ground it was on and the unstable ground around it.

== See also ==
- Trinity River Authority
