= Education in Dallas =

Dallas, Texas, United States, has a number of universities, colleges, schools and libraries.

== Colleges and universities ==
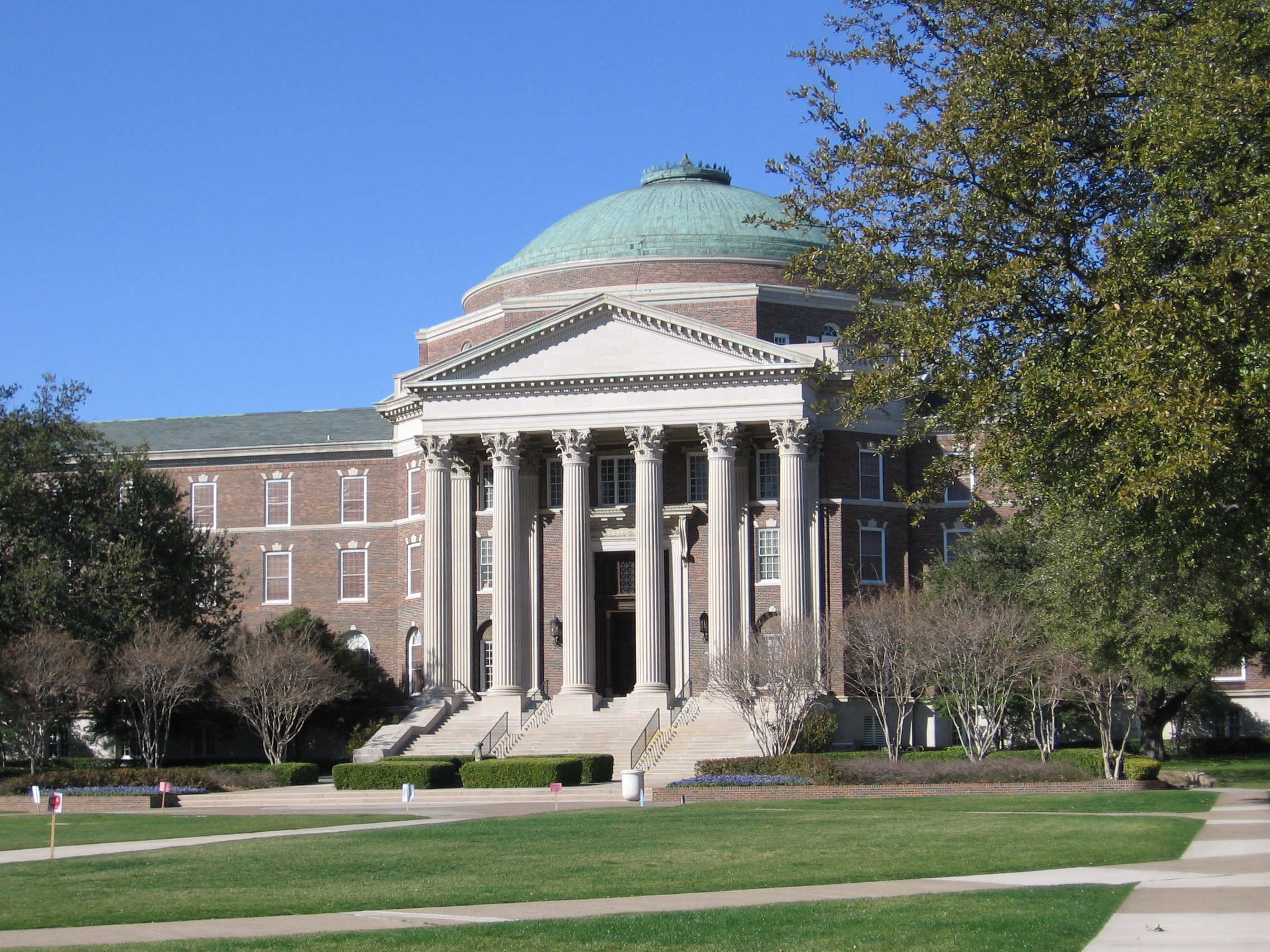
Dallas Hall at Dedman College at Southern Methodist University

Dallas is a major center of education for much of the South Central United States. The city itself contains several universities, colleges, trade schools, and educational institutes. Several major universities also lie in enclaves, satellite cities, and suburbs of the city, including the University of Texas at Dallas in Richardson, the University of Dallas in Irving, Dallas Christian College in Farmers Branch, DeVry University Dallas in Irving, the University of North Texas in Denton, the University of Texas at Arlington in Arlington and the Southwestern Assemblies of God University in Waxahachie.

Southern Methodist University (SMU) is a private university located in University Park, an enclave of Dallas. It was founded in 1911 by the Southern Methodist Church and now enrolls 6,500 undergraduates, 1,200 professional students in the law and theology departments, and 3,500 postgraduates SMU is also the home of the Cox School of Business.

Dallas Baptist University (DBU) is a private university located in the Mountain Creek area of southwestern Dallas. Originally located in Decatur, it moved to Dallas in 1965. The school currently enrolls over 5,500 students.

The University of North Texas at Dallas is located in South Dallas along University Hills Boulevard, which was formerly known as Houston School Road. It is the only public university within the Dallas city limits.

Paul Quinn College is a private Historically Black college located in southeast Dallas. Originally located in Waco, Texas, it moved to Dallas in 1993 and is housed on the campus of the former Bishop College, another private Historically Black college. Dallas billionaire and entrepreneur Comer Cottrell, founder of Pro-Line Corp., bought the campus of Bishop College and bequeathed it to Paul Quinn College in 1993. The school enrolls 3,000 undergraduate students.

The University of Texas Southwestern Medical School is a medical school located in the Stemmons Corridor of Dallas. It is part of the University of Texas Southwestern Medical Center at Dallas, one of the largest facilities of its kind in the world. The school is highly selective, admitting around 200 students a year. The facility enrolls 3,255 postgraduates.

== Schools ==
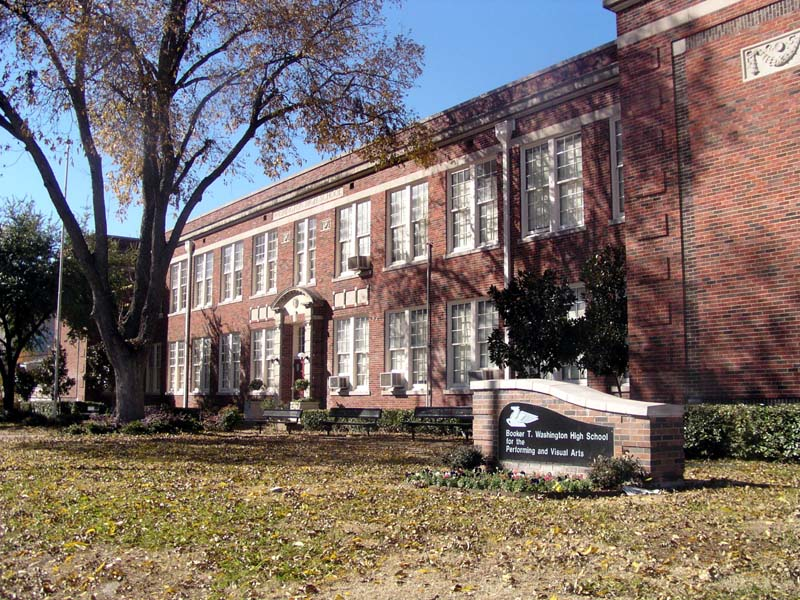
Booker T. Washington High School for the Performing and Visual Arts (DISD) in the Arts District

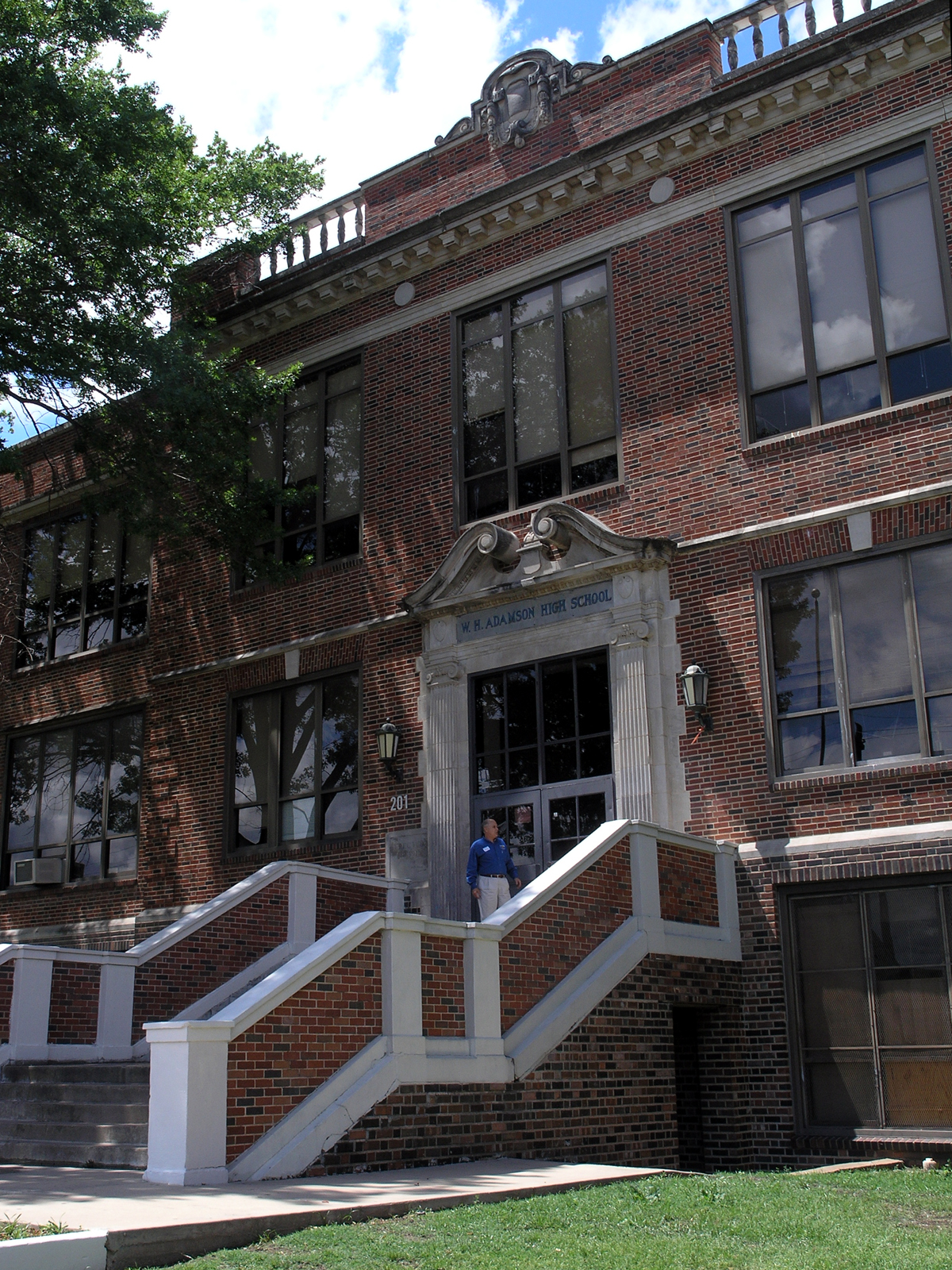
W. H. Adamson High School (DISD) in Oak Cliff

The Dallas Independent School District, which covers most of the city, is one of the largest school districts in the United States. It operates independently of the city and enrolls over 161,000 students. One of the district's magnet schools, the School for the Talented & Gifted, was named the #1 school in the United States (in a list of public and private schools) by Newsweek in 2006 and 2007. The Science and Engineering Magnet, another local magnet school, was ranked eighth in 2006 and second in 2007 in the same survey.

Dallas extends into several other school districts including Carrollton-Farmers Branch, Duncanville, Garland, Highland Park, Mesquite, Plano, and Richardson. The Wilmer-Hutchins Independent School District once served portions of southern Dallas, but it was shut down for the 2005-2006 year. WHISD students started attending other Dallas ISD schools during that time. Following the close, the Texas Education Agency consolidated WHISD into Dallas ISD, which will work to rebuild the schools in the former WHISD area.

- Residents of Highland Park ISD are in two areas: one that is north of Greenbrier Drive, south of Northwest Highway, east of the Dallas North Tollway, and west of Douglas Avenue; and in an area west of Preston Road and north of Colgate Avenue.
- Residents in Irving ISD are in west Dallas : an area south of the west fork of the Trinity River and north of the Bernal Greenbelt, and in an area west of Top Line Drive and south of the Trinity River.
- Residents in Plano ISD are there are two areas in Collin County that are in Plano ISD: one that is east of Midway Road, south of the George Bush Turnpike, and west of Waterview Parkway; and a group of apartments around Horizon North Parkway.
- Two portions of North Dallas are in Richardson ISD: One is north of Interstate 635, between Coit Road and Preston Road, and south of the Collin-Dallas county line; the other is the portion of Lake Highlands east of White Rock Creek and north of Northwest Highway.

A governmental agency called Dallas County Schools provides transportation services and other services to the school districts in Dallas County.

In addition Dallas County Community College District operates the Richland Collegiate High School.

In 2018 Dallas ISD board member Joyce Foreman asked Dallas City Council to no longer zone property to allow additional charter schools.

== Libraries ==
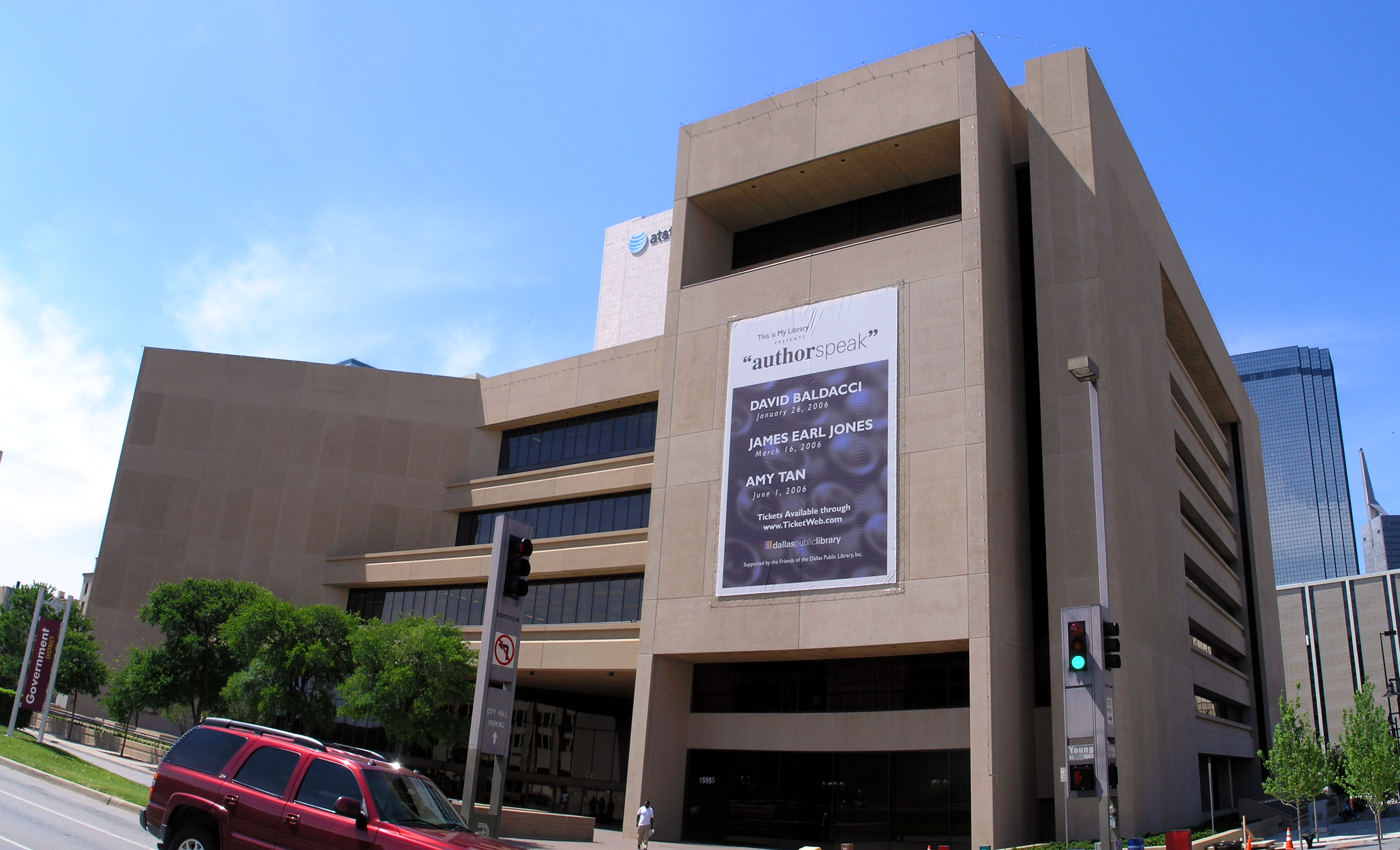
The J. Erik Jonsson Central Library, looking northwest from Young Street and Ervay Street

The city is served by the Dallas Public Library system. The system was originally created by the Dallas Federation of Women's Clubs with efforts spearheaded by then-president Mrs. Henry (May Dickson) Exall — Her work raising money led to a grant from philanthropist and steel baron Andrew Carnegie, which enabled the construction of the first branch in 1901. Today the library operates 25 branch locations throughout the city. The Dallas Public Library also operates J. Erik Jonsson Central Library, the 8-story main library in the Government District of downtown. It also operates the Bookmarks Children's library in the Northpark Mall.

The University of Texas Southwestern Medical Center in the Stemmons Corridor operates a library across two branches on its north and south campuses. The library holds 256,000 volumes in all formats, including 83,000 books and 30,000 full-text electronic journals.

== Weekend supplementary education ==
The Japanese School of Dallas, a Japanese supplementary weekend school, conducts its classes, intended for Japanese nationals and Japanese Americans, at Ted Polk Middle School in Carrollton; the school has its main offices in Farmers Branch. Its classes were formerly held at Dan F. Long Middle School in the Dallas city limits.
