= Ryan Agarwal =

American basketball player (born 2003)

No. 11 – Loyola Ramblers
- Position: Small forward / shooting guard
- League: Atlantic 10 Conference

Personal information
- Born: October 28, 2003 (age 23)
- Listed height: 6 ft 6 in (1.98 m)
- Listed weight: 205 lb (93 kg)

Career information
- High school: Coppell (Coppell, Texas)
- College: Stanford (2022–2026); Loyola Chicago (2026–present)

Ryan Agarwal (born October 28, 2003) is an American college basketball player for the Loyola Ramblers of the Atlantic 10 Conference. He previously played for the Stanford Cardinal.

Standing at six feet and six inches, Agarwal plays the small forward and shooting guard positions. Agarwal is only one of the four NCAA Division I men's basketball players of Indian heritage.

== Early life ==
Agarwal was born to Indian parents, Ashok and Ranjini Agarwal. Growing up, his parents encouraged him to try different sports, participating in flag football, baseball, and swimming, amongst others, though he fell in love with basketball. Agarwal started playing basketball seriously in the third grade, when he joined an Amateur Athletic Union team, the 3D Empire.

== High school career ==
Agarwal attended Coppell High School in Coppell, Texas, where he played basketball with Anthony Black. A four-star recruit by Rivals and ESPN, he was once rated as high as No. 84 nationally by Rivals and ranked as a top-20 shooting guard. 247Sports listed him as a three-star prospect. The summer before his junior year, Agarwal participated in the Pangos All-American camp. As a junior, he averaged 17 points, eight rebounds, and three assists per game, leading Coppell to a 17–4 record.

Agarwal was a three-time district champion, a three-time first-team all-district and first-team all-region selection as a sophomore and junior, and surpassed 1,000 career points as a junior. Agarwal was also a McDonald's All-American Game nominee and an All-State academic selection. Agarwal received offers from schools such as Creighton, Harvard, SMU, Princeton, Columbia, Rice, and Oklahoma State. On March 16, 2022, Agarwal committed to playing college basketball at Stanford University.

College recruiting
Name	Hometown	School	Height	Weight	Commit date
Ryan Agarwal; SF	Coppell, TX	Coppell High School	6 ft 6 in (1.98 m)	205 lb (93 kg)	Mar 16, 2021
Ryan Agarwal; SF	Recruit ratings: Rivals: 247Sports: ESPN: (82)				
Overall recruit ranking: Rivals: 97 (23 SF) 247Sports: 143 (28 SF) ESPN: 87 (20 SF)
Note: In many cases, Scout, Rivals, 247Sports, On3, and ESPN may conflict in their listings of height and weight.; In these cases, the average was taken. ESPN grades are on a 100-point scale.; Sources: "Stanford 2022 Basketball Commitments". Rivals.; "2022 Stanford Cardinal Recruiting Class". ESPN.; "2022 Team Ranking". Rivals.

== College career ==
=== Stanford Cardinal (2022-26) ===
==== 2022-23 season ====
As a freshman, Agarwal appeared in 17 games. He averaged 3.5 points per game, shot 50.0 percent from the field, and 45.7 percent from the 3-point line; he had the best 3-point percentage in the Pac-12 among players with at least 15 makes. Agarwal also scored in double figures twice, vs. Green Bay on December 16 and at Washington on January 12.

==== 2023-24 season ====
As a sophomore, Agarwal received the Pac-12 Academic Honor Roll award. He appeared in five games off the bench, averaging 2.4 points throughout those games, which was a decrease from his performance the previous year. He scored a season-high seven points against Eastern Washington on November 17.

==== 2024-25 season ====
As a Redshirt Sophomore and Junior in the 2024–25 season, Agarwal earned numerous academic and athletic honors, including CSC Academic All-District, ACC All-Academic Team, and NABC Honors Court recognition, while also making the Pac-12 Academic Honor Roll in 2024. He appeared in 35 games with 29 starts, averaging 7.3 points, 4.9 rebounds, and 2.1 assists per game, ranking second on the team in rebounds and assists and fourth in scoring, with an impressive 81.8 percent free-throw percentage. He scored a career-high 15 points against Northern Arizona on November 12 and finished in double figures nine times, recorded two double-digit rebounding games including a career-high 12 at Notre Dame on March 5, and had 13 games with three or more assists, setting a career best with eight in a win over NC State on February 8, including the game-winning layup with 8.1 seconds remaining. He improved his scoring average by 5.1 points per game from the previous season and helped Stanford achieve its most wins (21) since 2015, a program record-tying 17 wins at Maples Pavilion, and school team records in three-pointers (294), free throw percentage (.789), and fewest turnovers per game (10.5).

==== 2025-26 season ====
On January 14, 2026, Agarwal scored a career-high 20 points, paired with six rebounds and one assist, in 34 minutes against North Carolina. He led the game in rebounds for the Cardinals. On April 6, 2026, Agarwal announced that he will be entering the transfer portal with one year of eligibility left remaining.

=== Loyola Ramblers (2026-present) ===
On April 28, 2026, Agarwal announced that he would be transferring to Loyola Chicago, where he would spend his final season playing for the Loyola Ramblers.

== Personal life ==
Agarwal has two older siblings: a brother, Rohit, who does private equity and helped out Agarwal with the recruitment process and finding an agent, and a sister, Nikita, who also played basketball and serves as the family's emotional support. She also attends medical school. Agarwal's dad, Ashok, is a financial advisor, and his mom, Ranjini, loves to bake. He also has a pet dog named Duke.

Agarwal played basketball with Anthony Black, and cited how Satnam Singh was his inspiration growing up. He is also good friends with NBA player Harrison Ingram.

Agarwal cites how his coach, Shawn from his 3D Empire basketball team, was his biggest influence, and Kevin Durant was one of the players whom Agarwal modeled his game after.
