= New Tech High School at Coppell =

New Tech High School @ Coppell
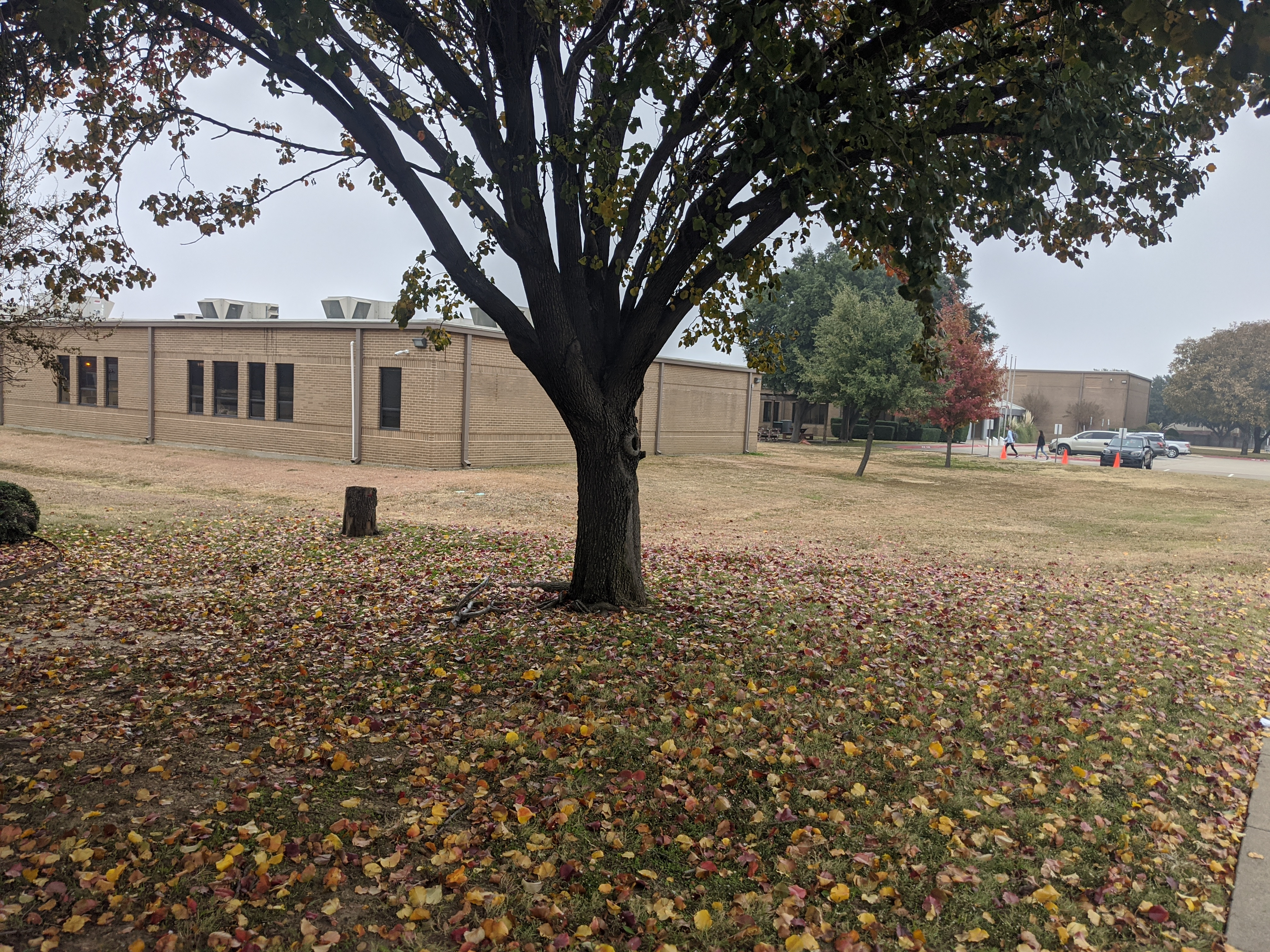

Location
- 113 Samuel Boulevard; Coppell, Texas 75019; United States
- 32.971941°N 96.973115°W

Information
- Established: 2008
- Director: Zane Porter
- Teaching staff: 27.67 (FTE)
- Enrollment: 361 (2023–2024)
- Student to teacher ratio: 13.05
- Colors: Red, Black, and Silver
- Mascot: Falcons (unofficial)
- Team name: Falcons (unofficial)
- Website: www.coppellisd.com/newtech

New Tech High @ Coppell (NTH@C) is a secondary high school located in Coppell, Texas, United States, a suburb of Dallas. It is the second high school in the Coppell Independent School District. It is part of the New Tech Network which nationwide has 86 "New Tech" schools. The school had its first senior class in 2011 and has a current enrollment of 382 students with 33 staff members. The school is also toured often by school districts and politicians interested in New Tech. It also has the shortest elapsed time in between when it starts and ends.

As of 2024, the high school is under a referendum from the Coppell Independent School District. They state that if New Tech High @ Coppell does not get enrollment numbers up within the next three years, the school will be forcibly shut down. This will place more population pressure on the district’s already-full main Coppell High School, and newer Ninth Grade Center.

== Demographics ==
As of the 2022-2023 school year, the student population is made up of the following ethnicities out of 382 students

Ethnicity	%
White	41%
Asian	32%
Hispanic	17%
African American	4%
American Indian & Other	1%

Demographics for the 2022-2023 school year

== Campus ==
New Tech High School @ Coppell is located at the former Lee Elementary School, which closed in June 2008. The school district plans to build a new campus for the high school near North Lake, Texas. In mid-October 2008, Coppell ISD had signed closing documents on 82 acres (33 ha), with plans to buy an additional 40 acres (160,000 m^{2}) and build at least three new schools on the land.

== Student Activities ==
=== Clubs ===
Art Club, Newspaper Club, Basketball Club, Ultimate Frisbee Club, DECA, One Earth, FIRST Tech Challenge, Mu Alpha Theta, and Model United Nations.

=== Student Leadership ===
National Honor Society, Hope Squad, Networking Team Captain (NTC), and Student Council (StuCo).
