= Febechi Nwaiwu =

American football player (born 2003)

No. 64 – Houston Texans
- Position: Guard
- Roster status: Active

Personal information
- Born: February 17, 2003 (age 23); Coppell, Texas, U.S.
- Listed height: 6 ft 4 in (1.93 m)
- Listed weight: 319 lb (145 kg)

Career information
- High school: Coppell
- College: North Texas (2021–2023); Oklahoma (2024–2025)
- NFL draft: 2026: 4th round, 106th overall pick

Career history
- Houston Texans (2026–present)

Awards and highlights
- First-team All-American (2025); Second-team All-SEC (2025); Third-team All-AAC (2023)

Career NFL statistics as of Week 4, 2026
- Games played: 2
- Stats at Pro Football Reference

Febechi Nwaiwu (born February 17, 2003) is an American professional football guard for the Houston Texans of the National Football League (NFL). He played college football for the Oklahoma Sooners and North Texas Mean Green and was selected by the Texans in the fourth round of the 2026 NFL draft.

== Early life ==
Febechi is of Nigerian descent. Nwaiwu attended Coppell High School located in Coppell, Texas. He committed to play college football for the North Texas Mean Green joining the team as a walk-on.

== College career ==
=== North Texas ===
During his three-year career at North Texas from 2021 to 2023, Nwaiwu appeared in 28 games with 22 starts, earning freshman all American and to the Conference USA All-Freshman Team in 2022 after utilizing a redshirt season. After earning third-team all-conference honors in 2023, Nwaiwu entered his name into the NCAA transfer portal.

=== Oklahoma ===
Nwaiwu transferred to play for the Oklahoma Sooners. During his first season as a Sooner in 2024, he started in all 13 games. In the 2025 regular season finale, Nwaiwu made his first collegiate start at center in a victory over LSU. For his performance during the 2025 season, he was named a finalist for the Burlsworth Award, as well as being awarded the Don Key Award. Nwaiwu earned second-team all-SEC and first-team all-American honors.

== Professional career ==
Pre-draft measurables
Height	Weight	Arm length	Hand span	Wingspan	40-yard dash	10-yard split	20-yard split	20-yard shuttle	Three-cone drill	Vertical jump	Broad jump	Bench press
6 ft 4 1/4 in (1.94 m)	319 lb (145 kg)	34 1/2 in (0.88 m)	9 5/8 in (0.24 m)	6 ft 10 3/4 in (2.10 m)	5.36 s	1.85 s	3.19 s	4.73 s	7.80 s	24.5 in (0.62 m)	8 ft 9 in (2.67 m)	29 reps
All values from NFL Combine/Pro Day

Nwaiwu was selected by the Houston Texans in the fourth round with the 106th overall pick in the 2026 NFL draft. His selection was announced by professional wrestler Raquel Rodriguez.
