= Dallas County Schools =

Former school transportation provider in Dallas County, Texas

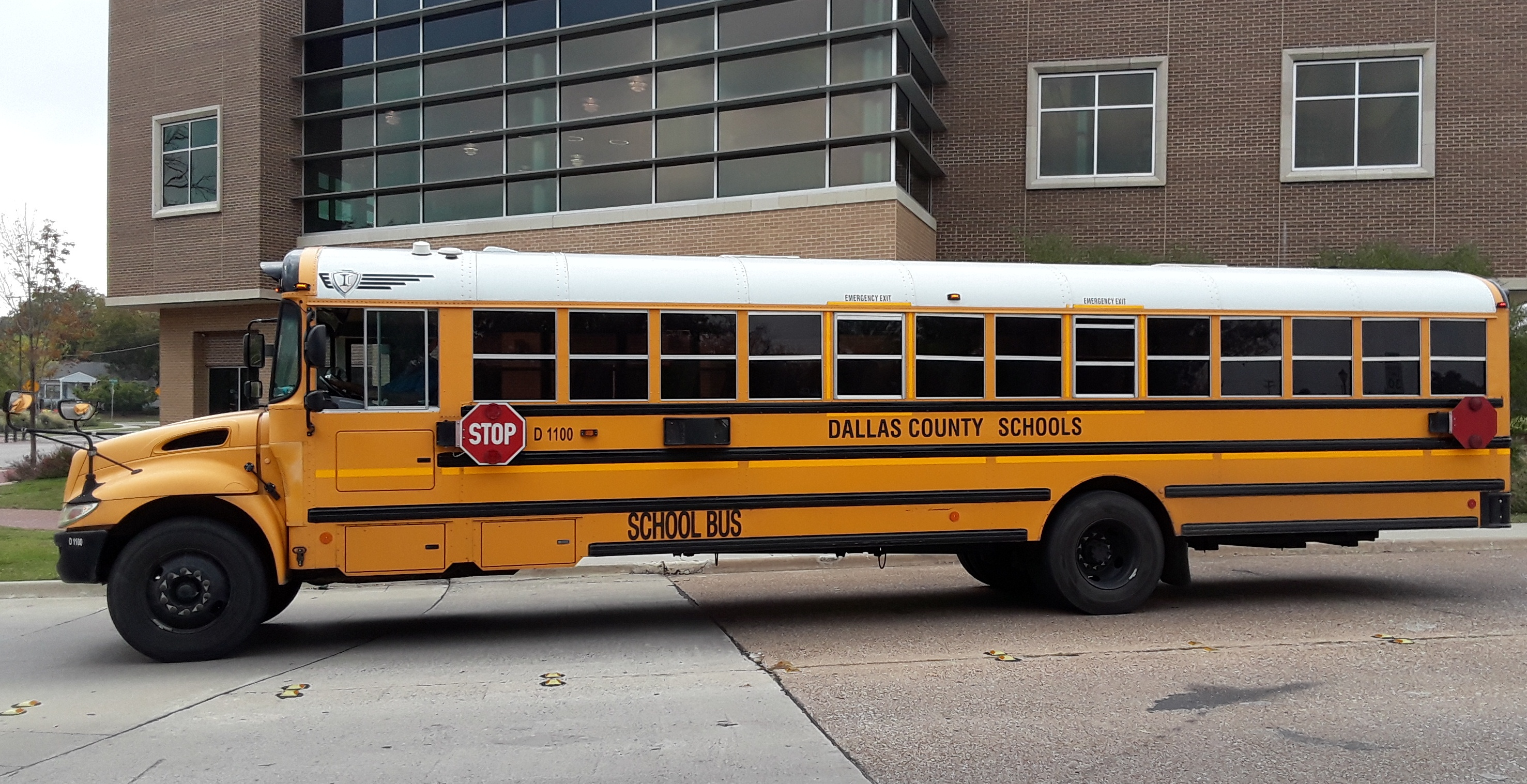
- A school bus previously operated by DCS in Irving, Texas.
- Founded: 1846
- Defunct: 2018
- Headquarters: 5151 Samuell Blvd. Dallas, Texas 75228
- Service area: Dallas County, Texas, and parts of Denton, Parker and Tarrant Counties
- Service type: School bus transport
- Fleet: 2,000 (September 2017)
- Website: Dissolution Committee for the former Board of Dallas County School Trustees

Dallas County Schools (DCS) was a school bus transportation agency in Dallas County, Texas. The public agency, founded in 1846, provided student transportation services to school districts, charter schools and private schools in the county. DCS also served select school districts in Parker and Tarrant Counties under the name TexServe.

Until its dissolution in 2018 following a corruption scandal, DCS was one of the largest student transportation fleets in the nation. It operated a fleet of approximately 2,000 buses and transported more than 75,000 students per day.

== History ==
=== Corruption scandal ===
In 2010, Dallas County Schools began accepting bids for a supplier of stop-arm cameras. These cameras would photograph drivers that passed by a stopped bus, resulting in a traffic ticket for the driver. DCS would receive a cut of the fine, which would be used to cover the cost of the camera order.

DCS selected a company called Force Multiplier Solutions, despite FMS issuing one of the higher bids for the initiative. Additionally, the district bought far more cameras than required, with an estimated 3,000 (out of 7,000 total) never or rarely used. It was later determined that Robert Leonard, the CEO of Force Multiplier Solutions, bribed DCS officials, most notably superintendent Dr. Rick Sorrells and chairman Larry Duncan, into contracting with FMS.

In 2015, DCS agreed to a triple-net sale-leaseback deal on four bus service centers, wherein the properties would be sold to a new owner and then leased on a month-by-month basis. This raised $25 million in cash ($7 million above the centers' estimated market value), but it locked the district into $47 million of long-term debt, and the district was still responsible for property taxes, maintenance, and insurance. An investigation by KXAS-TV determined that the deal's broker had ties to Force Multiplier Solutions.

=== Client losses ===
In early 2017, Weatherford ISD voted to terminate its $1.3 million contract with DCS, which had started the previous year. Weatherford ISD leadership stated the move was unrelated to the DCS's financial issues, describing it as part of a plan to move its transportation services in-house. Later that year, Coppell ISD voted to terminate its $4.4 million contract with DCS in favor of private operator Durham School Services. Coppell ISD leadership cited an influx of students and a driver shortage at DCS.

=== Dissolution ===
In November 2017, a countywide referendum was held on DCS's continuation, with 58% of voters opposed. DCS was shut down, ending 171 years of service, and its board of trustees was replaced with a dissolution committee. The dissolution committee continued to provide bus services until July 31, 2018, at which point DCS's client districts would need to organize their own bus transportation or partner with private school bus contractors.

At its dissolution, DCS owed approximately $106 million to 33 creditors over seven years. To pay back the debt, the dissolution committee established a "school equalization" property tax in DCS's former boundaries.

In July 2018, the dissolution committee filed suit against Robert Leonard and former DCS leadership, alleging that DCS lost $125 million due to corruption. The lawsuit also alleged that Larry Duncan, the chairman of the DCS board, had taken $240,000 in campaign contributions from donors connected to the scandal, some of which was not properly reported.

In 2019, former superintendent Dr. Rick Sorrells was sentenced to seven years in prison for bribery. His sentence was reduced from 20 years due to cooperation with law enforcement.

== Former clients ==
Unless otherwise noted, these school districts now provide their own bus transportation.

- Aledo ISD (as TexServe)
- Carrollton-Farmers Branch ISD
- Cedar Hill ISD (now served by First Student)
- Coppell ISD (left DCS in 2017; now served by Durham School Services)
- Dallas ISD
- Highland Park ISD (now served by Durham School Services)
- Irving ISD (now served by First Student)
- Lancaster ISD
- Richardson ISD
- Weatherford ISD (as TexServe; left DCS in 2017)
- White Settlement ISD (as TexServe; now served by GoldStar Transit)

In addition, DCS provided supplemental transportation services (such as Juvenile Justice or Substance Abuse Unit transportation services) to four other school districts:

- Duncanville ISD
- Garland ISD
- Grand Prairie ISD
- Mesquite ISD
