= Dallas International School =

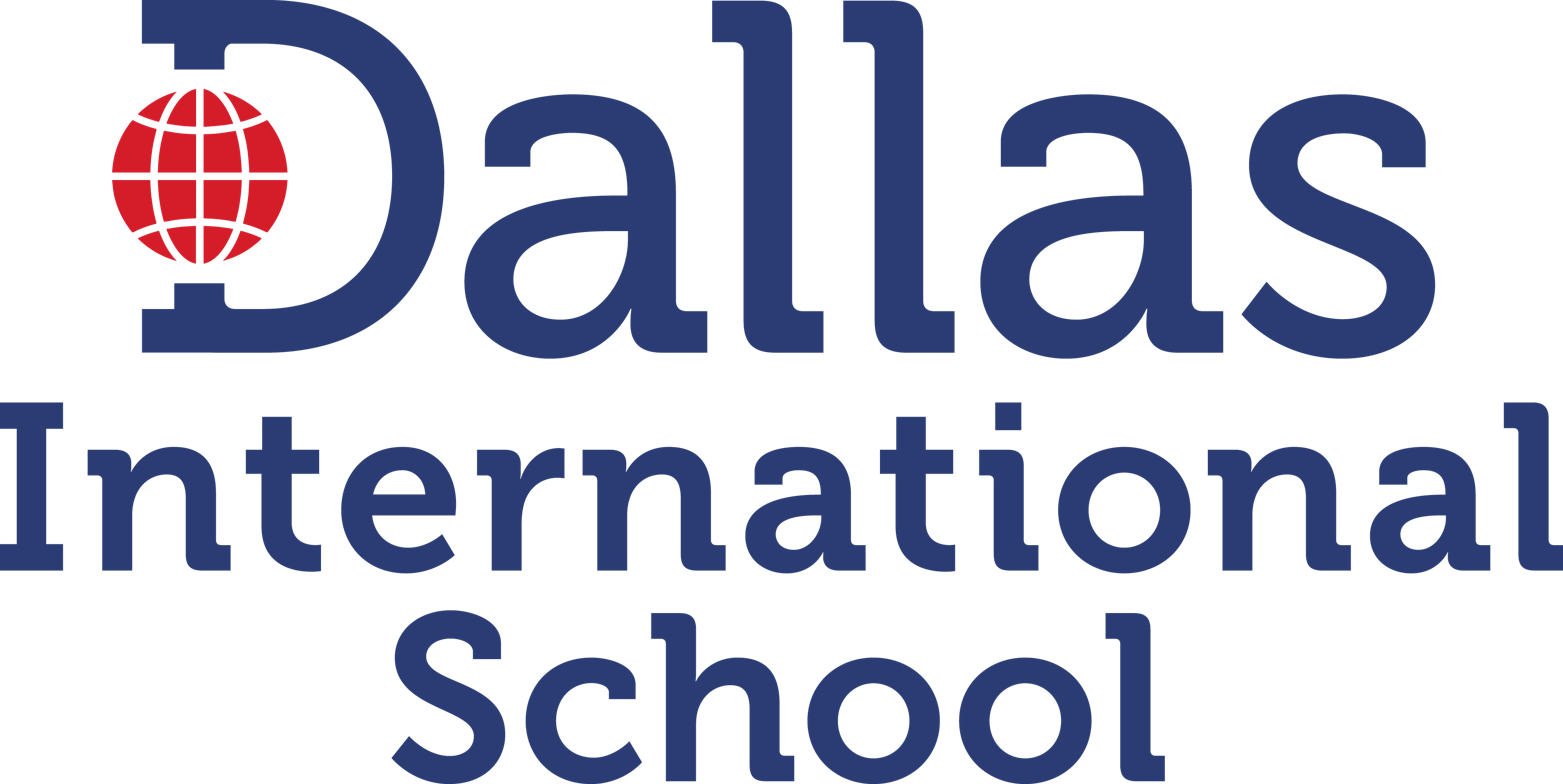

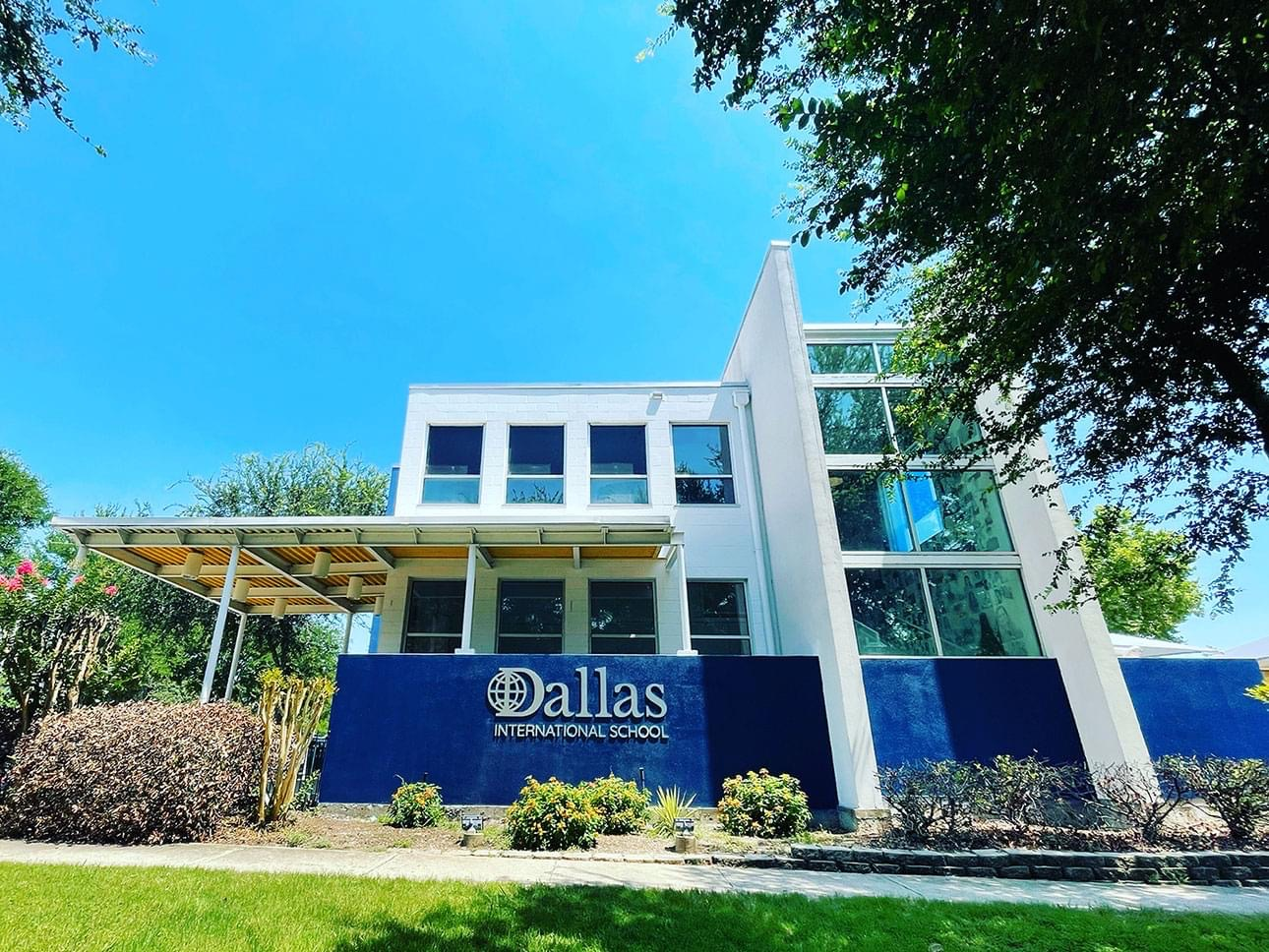
- EC2-4th Grade Campus

Location
- EC2-4th Grade Campus; 6039 Churchill Way; Dallas, Texas 75230; United States 5th-12th Grade Campus; 17811 Waterview Pkwy; Dallas, Texas 75252; United States; 32.917538°N 96.801640°W

Information
- Type: French International School
- Motto: Globally inspired. Distinctly different.
- Established: 1987
- Head of school: Jacques A. Weber
- Faculty: 150
- Grades: EC2 to 12th grade
- Enrollment: 685 (2025-2026)
- Colors: Dark blue and dark red
- Mascot: Tiger (Tom le Tigre)
- Accreditations: MEN, ISAS
- Newspaper: The Globe
- Affiliation: AEFE (Agency for French Education Abroad), ISAS (Independent Schools Association of the Southwest)
- Diplomas awarded: DIS High School Diploma, French Baccalauréat Diploma, International Baccalaureate Diploma (including Bilingual and Advanced Bilingual)
- Languages taught: French, English, Spanish, Mandarin, German
- Language Certifications: French (DELF)
- Website: dallasinternationalschool.org

Dallas International School (DIS) is an early childhood, elementary, middle, and high school in the North Dallas area in Dallas, Texas, United States, and is the only international private school in Dallas. The school delivers the curriculum primarily in English and French and the academic program is based on the French educational system. Dallas International is regionally accredited by the Independent Schools Association of the Southwest (ISAS). In 2016, DIS was ranked by The Washington Post as #24 in the nation for "America's Most Challenging High Schools. It is currently ranked #5 in top private schools in Dallas–Fort Worth metroplex by Niche.

== Curriculum ==
In early childhood (i.e., 2–5 years old), 50% of the education is in French, 40% in English and 10% in Spanish. In elementary school grades, about 70% of instruction is in French and 30% in English. In addition, students have one hour of Spanish instruction per week. In middle school grades, all subjects are taught in French. English education occurs 3 to 5 hours per week. A student may take either Mandarin, German, or Spanish for three hours per week.

In high school, a student may stay in the French language track leading to the French Baccalaureate Diploma, or may enter the English language track leading to the International Baccalaureate (IB) Diploma. Due to the school's bilingual nature, many students choose to pursue a Bilingual IB Diploma. DIS is also only one of 25 schools in the world to offer access to the IB's Advanced Bilingual Diploma.

Beginning in the 2025-26 school year, DIS expanded its International Program from 5th to 12th grades, with core courses taught in English. DIS is a candidate school for the IB Middle Years Programme (IB MYP), which is offered in 6th through 10th grades and leads to the school's longstanding IB Diploma Programme, which has been in place since 2007. As the DFW metroplex's first IB Career-related Programme (IB CP) school, DIS students also have the opportunity to pursue career-related studies in aviation during high school. Students in all three IB programs can pursue language acquisition in French, German, Mandarin, and Spanish.

== Location ==
Dallas International School has two campuses located in North Dallas. The lower school campus (EC2 to 4th grade) is referred to as the Churchill campus and is located at 6039 Churchill Way, Dallas, Texas 75230. The upper school campus (5th grade to 12th grade) is referred to as the Waterview campus and is located at 17811 Waterview Parkway, Dallas, Texas 75252.

== See also ==
- Education in Dallas
- Agency for French Education Abroad
- International school
