= RCHS =

RCHS can refer to many things:

== Schools ==
- Rock Canyon High School in Highlands Ranch, Colorado
- Raleigh Charter High School in Raleigh, North Carolina
- Rancho Cucamonga High School in Rancho Cucamonga, California
- Rensselaer Central High School in Rensselaer, Indiana
- Richland Collegiate High School in Dallas, Texas
- Rochester Community High School in Rochester, Indiana
- Rockdale County High School in Conyers, Georgia
- Roman Catholic High School for Boys in Philadelphia, Pennsylvania
- Rushville Consolidated High School in Rushville, Indiana
- Rappahannock County High School in Washington, Virginia
- Roselle Catholic High School in Roselle, New Jersey
- Rancho Cotate High School in Rohnert Park, California
- Ruleville Central High School (now Thomas E. Edwards, Sr. High School) in Ruleville, Mississippi
- Reed-Custer High School in Braidwood, Illinois
- Richmond Community High School in Richmond, Virginia

== Other uses ==
- Railway and Canal Historical Society, Great Britain's principal transport history society
- Royal Caledonian Horticultural Society, the national horticultural society of Scotland
