= Northaven Trail =

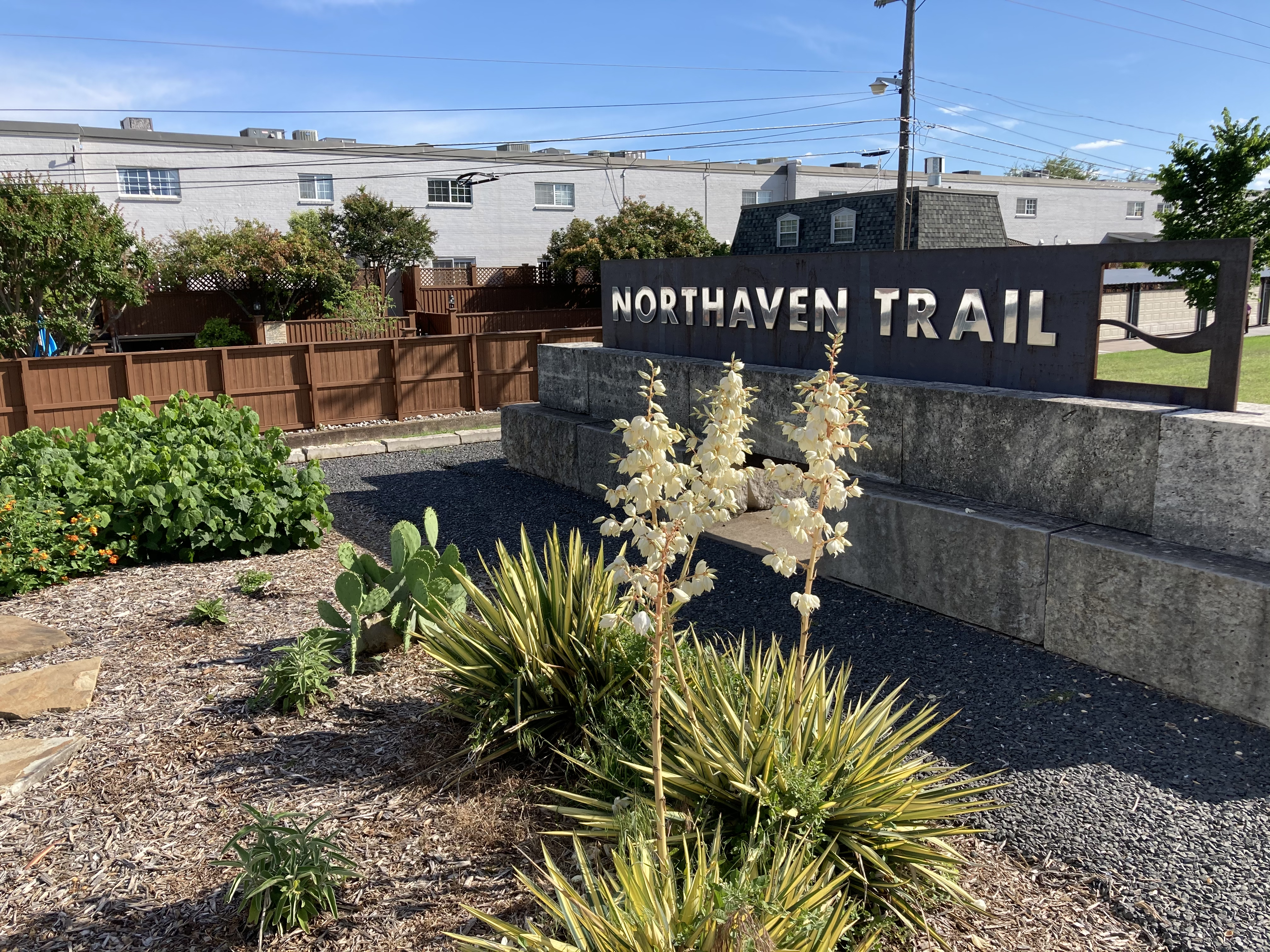
Northaven Trail Signage

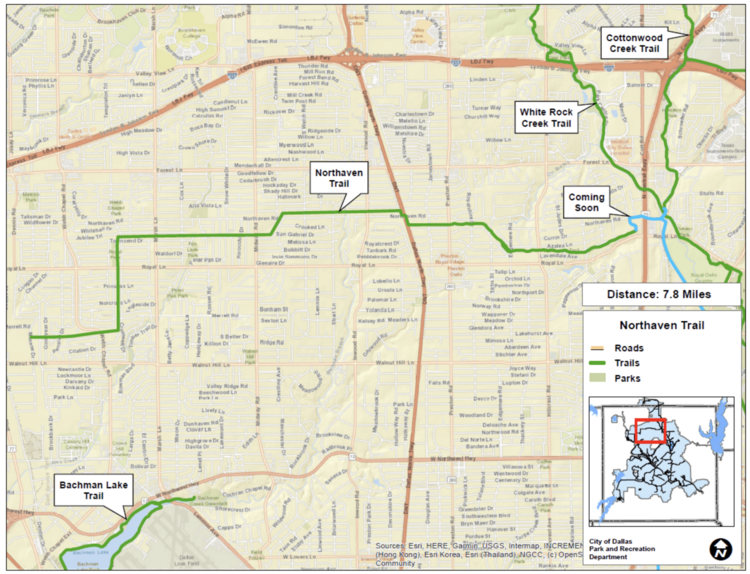
Dallas Parks Map of the Northaven Trail

The Northaven Trail is a 9.3-mile hike/bike commuter and recreational trail that runs through the northern neighborhoods in Dallas, Texas. Currently, the trail connects the neighborhoods from Central Expressway (US75) to Denton Drive and the Dallas DART station. It provides a recreational resource for the area as well as providing east-west transportation alternatives. The trail is part of the greater Dallas Parks Department and part of the Texas Department of Transportation’s and Dallas City Council's plan to increase alternative means of transportation throughout the city.

The trail includes the first-ever pedestrian bridge over Central Expressway which connects the Northaven Trail to the White Rock Creek Trail, SoPac Trail and Cottonwood Creek Trail on the east.

For western expansion, the aim is to connect the trail to Bachman Lake and Dallas Love Field area.

== About ==
The Northaven Trail is a commuter and recreational bike and hike trail built and maintained by the Dallas Parks and Recreation Department. The trail runs from the west side of Central Expressway to Denton Drive and Walnut Hill with plans to connect to Bachman Lake and Irving’s Campion Trail on the west.

The trail consists of a 12-foot-wide concrete path for pedestrians and cyclists that runs 9.3 miles (15 km) through the Hillcrest Forest, Hockaday, Northaven Park, and Sparkman neighborhoods of North Dallas.

== History ==
The Northaven Trail started out as a 2.5-mile trail stretching from Valleydale Drive (near Central Expressway) on the east to Preston Road on the west. Construction on the Northaven Trail began in 2010 and was completed in 2012.

The trail’s path took advantage of Oncor’s east-west power-line corridor through North Dallas neighborhoods.

The trail’s western expansion began to take shape with construction starting in 2017 and finishing in 2019. This phase extended the trail to 9.3 miles between Valleydale Drive and Denton Drive.

Initial funding for the project came through a variety of sources, including federal, Dallas County, city, and private donations. The Friends of the Northaven Trail, a nonprofit organization, was founded in 2010 to organize public and private support for development, maintenance, and usage of the Northaven Trail.

The Northaven Trail is part of the overall Dallas Parks and Recreation’s plan to provide alternative transportation options to the residents of Dallas.

In recent years, the Friends of the Northaven Trail have prioritized a long-term rewilding effort along the corridor—an increasingly rare opportunity within the urban landscape of Dallas. With much of the trail situated within a utility easement that limits traditional landscaping, the organization focused on restoring native prairie habitat and supporting biodiversity. These efforts include seeding extensive stretches of the trail with native wildflowers and grasses to support pollinators, increase ecological resilience, and provide natural beauty for trail users. A particularly significant rewilding initiative is underway on the west side of the trail, where the City of Dallas Parks and Recreation Department acquired additional land. In addition to other areas along the trail at that location, approximately two acres of the park site are being considered for native Blackland Prairie restoration, helping reestablish one of the most endangered ecosystems in North America.

In 2021, construction began on a long-planned pedestrian bridge spanning U.S. Route 75 (Central Expressway), intended to connect the Northaven Trail with several other major trail systems in Dallas, including the White Rock Creek, Cottonwood, and SoPac Trails. The bridge—often referred to as the "Low Five" for its role in linking five regional trails—was installed in late 2023 and officially opened to the public in December of that year. Its completion marked a major milestone for cross-city connectivity and regional trail expansion.

To celebrate and enhance the new bridge, the Friends of the Northaven Trail commissioned a public art installation in 2024. Dallas-based muralist Chera Brooker of Chera Creative was selected to design and paint a series of nature-themed murals on the bridge’s western columns. Each of the eight columns features native Texas wildflowers and their associated pollinators, reflecting the trail’s broader ecological mission. The mural project not only brings vibrant visual appeal to the structure but also reinforces ongoing efforts to educate the public about the importance of native habitats and biodiversity.

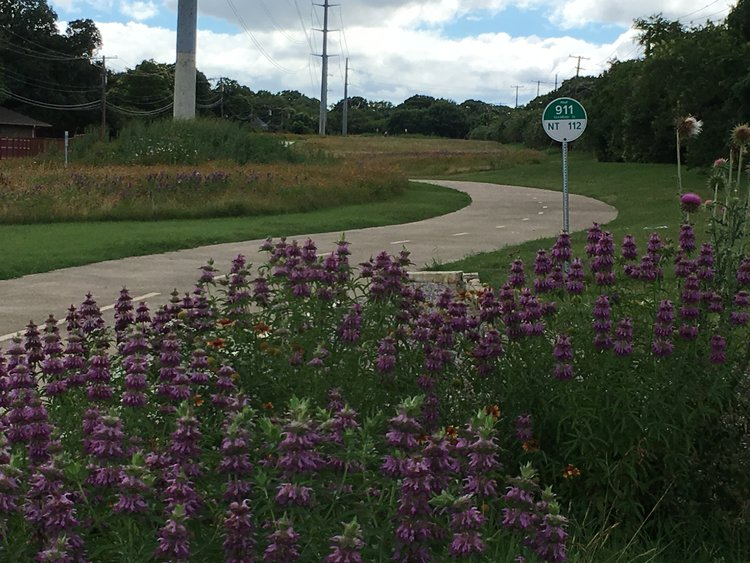
Check out the wildflowers on the Northaven Trail near the Freda Stern respite. Photo taken June 5, 2019.

== Rewilding ==
The United Nations has listed re-wilding as one of several methods needed to achieve massive scale restoration of natural ecosystems, which they say must be accomplished by 2030. As part of this activity, the Friends of Northaven Trail, along with Dallas Parks Department, annually plants native wildflowers along the trail and prevents mowing of these areas.

In the future, the trail plans to integrate strands of Blackland prairie grasses and wildflowers, with garden sections to specifically attract butterflies, pollinators, hummingbirds, and migrating songbirds, with accents and ornamental places for friends and neighbors to meet and enjoy the trail.

The carefully curated landscape of native plants will resemble flowing slices of the original North Texas Blackland prairie, punctuated by ornamental gardens. Landscaping choices have meaningful effects on the populations of birds and the insects they need to survive. The landscape will benefit birds, pollinators and other wildlife who need these native plants to survive and thrive, and at the same time be a pleasant place for people to visit.

For more information on Rewilding and its benefits, here are some key sources of information:

"What is Rewilding" by Rewilding Institute

"What is Rewilding" by True Nature Foundation

"Why Native Plants Matter" by National Audubon Society

"Native Plants" by The National Wildlife Federation

== Master plan ==
In 2023, the trail expanded, this time to the east. With the first pedestrian bridge over Central Expressway, Northaven Trail connects to the wider Dallas trail system with White Rock Creek Trail, Cottonwood Trail, and, eventually, the SoPAC Trail. This bridge is aptly named the "Low Five" in contrast to the Dallas High Five interchange bridge connecting 75 and 635.

"Northaven Trail Pedestrian Bridge Over US 75 Will Link Disconnected Neighborhoods: An expansion over the highway will link the North Dallas trail to the White Rock Creek, Cottonwood, and SoPac trails on the east side of Central." D-Magazine

The bridge was funded by TxDOT which states "The project will join the Northaven Trail to existing trails east of US 75 and the regional trail system. The project stands as a regional example of the positive benefits of appropriate location and design aesthetics for future bicycle and pedestrian trails and amenities."

A key element of the Northaven Trail’s long-term vision is enhancing its ecological value while working within the constraints of the Oncor utility easement, which prohibits the planting of most trees and large vegetation. In response, trail planners have prioritized the introduction of native wildflowers along the entire length of the trail. This initiative aims to create one of the longest contiguous stretches of wildflower plantings in the state of Texas, providing seasonal beauty, supporting pollinators, and promoting biodiversity.

In addition to the wildflower efforts, there is a strong focus on restoring native Blackland Prairie habitat, particularly on the western end of the trail. Restoration efforts include reseeding with native grasses and forbs and removing invasive species in targeted areas. The Dallas Parks and Recreation Department has also acquired a substantial parcel of land adjacent to the trail’s west side. Approximately two acres of this site are being considered for native prairie restoration, further expanding the ecological impact of the trail and offering a rare opportunity to preserve and reestablish a disappearing Texas ecosystem.

== See also ==
- Preston Hollow, Dallas
