= Connor Williams (American football) =

American football player (born 1997)

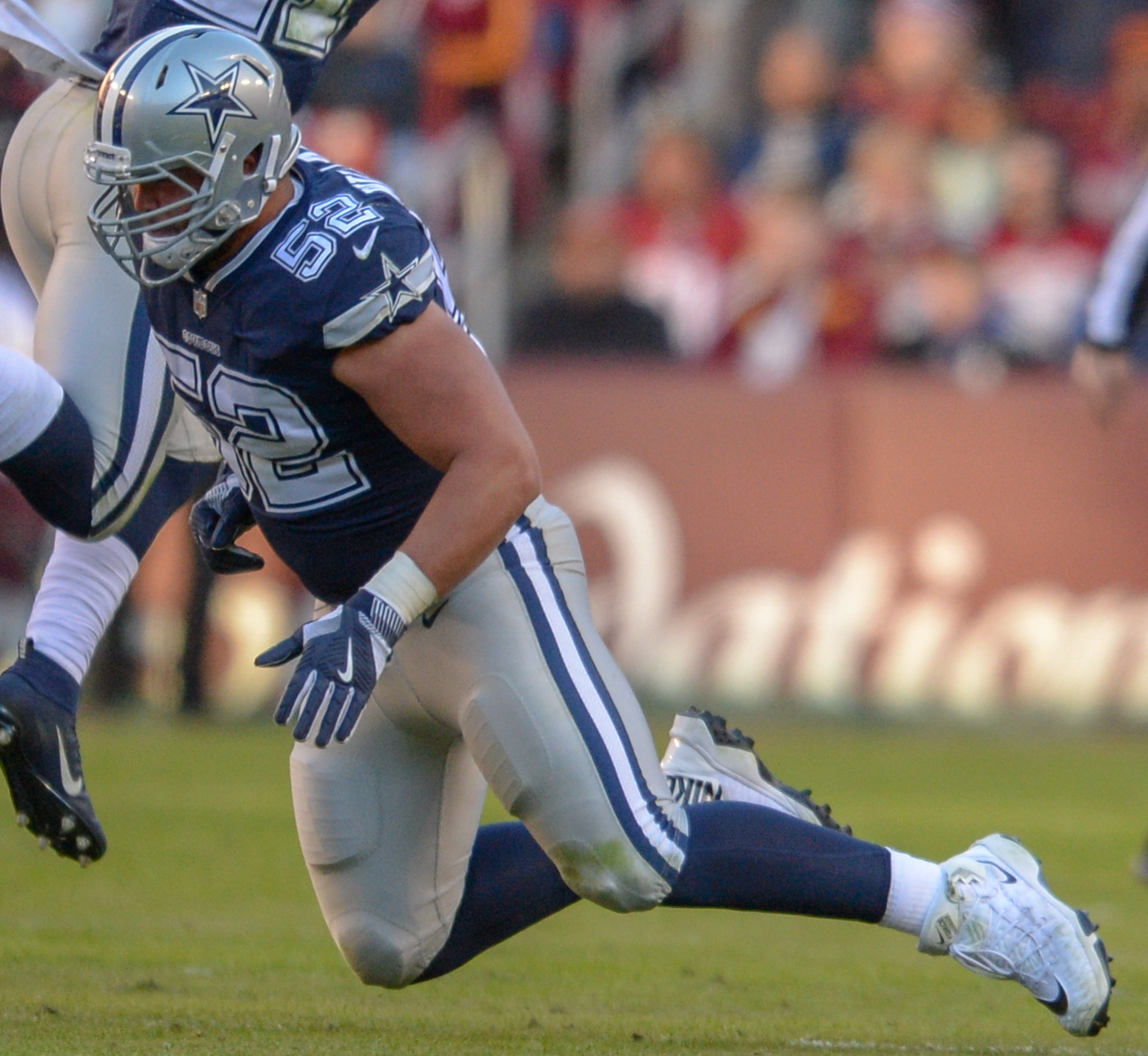
- Williams with the Dallas Cowboys in 2018

No. 52, 58, 57
- Position: Center

Personal information
- Born: May 12, 1997 (age 29); Coppell, Texas, U.S.
- Listed height: 6 ft 5 in (1.96 m)
- Listed weight: 310 lb (141 kg)

Career information
- High school: Coppell
- College: Texas (2015–2017)
- NFL draft: 2018: 2nd round, 50th overall pick

Career history
- Dallas Cowboys (2018–2021); Miami Dolphins (2022–2023); Seattle Seahawks (2024)

Awards and highlights
- Consensus All-American (2016); First-team All-Big 12 (2016); Freshman All-American (2015)

Career NFL statistics
- Games played: 92
- Games started: 86
- Stats at Pro Football Reference

Connor Williams (born May 12, 1997) is an American former professional football player who was a center in the National Football League (NFL) for the Dallas Cowboys, Miami Dolphins, and Seattle Seahawks. He played college football for the Texas Longhorns and was selected by the Cowboys in the second round of the 2018 NFL draft.

== Early life ==
Williams attended Coppell High School. As a freshman, he started the last 3 games at right tackle. As a sophomore, he was moved to tight end, but by the end of the season he was switched to left tackle.

As a senior, he was a two-way player, allowing one sack and one holding penalty, while making 38 tackles (5 for loss), 3 sacks, 5 quarterback pressures, 5 forced fumbles and 2 passes defensed. He was a second-team 6A All-State and an All-district selection.

Williams was a teammate of future NFL player Solomon Thomas. He also played basketball.

== College career ==
Williams accepted a football scholarship from the University of Texas at Austin. As a freshman, he started all 12 games at left tackle.

As a sophomore, he started 11 out of 12 games at left tackle and was considered by the media and coaches one of the best offensive tackles in college football. He became just the fourth sophomore in school history to receive consensus first-team All-American honors.

As a junior, he suffered a left knee injury in the third game against USC. He returned to play in the eleventh game against West Virginia University. He started only five out of 12 games at left tackle (first 3 and final 2 regular season contests). On November 27, 2017, Williams announced that he would forgo his senior year in favor of the 2018 NFL draft, and that he would not play in the 2017 Texas Bowl.

== Professional career ==
Pre-draft measurables
Height	Weight	Arm length	Hand span	40-yard dash	10-yard split	20-yard split	20-yard shuttle	Three-cone drill	Vertical jump	Broad jump	Bench press
6 ft 5 1/8 in (1.96 m)	296 lb (134 kg)	33 in (0.84 m)	10 1/2 in (0.27 m)	5.05 s	1.72 s	2.89 s	4.63 s	7.83 s	34.0 in (0.86 m)	9 ft 4 in (2.84 m)	26 reps
All values from NFL Combine

=== Dallas Cowboys ===
Williams was selected by the Dallas Cowboys in the second round (50th overall) of the 2018 NFL draft, with the intention of playing him at guard. He was named the starting left guard, starting the first eight games before being benched in Week 10 in favor of Xavier Su'a-Filo. He then started two games at right guard in place of an injured Zack Martin.

In 2019, he entered the season as the Cowboys' starting left guard. He started 11 games, missing one due to arthroscopic knee surgery, before suffering a torn right ACL in Week 13. He was placed on injured reserve on December 1, 2019.

In 2020, he was able to recover from a torn ACL to start all 16 games at left guard for the first time in his career, missing just one snap on offense (in the season opener). He also had to adjust to four different starting quarterbacks during the season.

In 2021, although he was tried briefly at center during training camp, he remained at his traditional left guard position. His play regressed during the first 10 weeks, when he led the league with 13 penalties (8 for holding). He was benched the next 4 games in favor of third-year guard Connor McGovern. As a backup, he was able to show his versatility when he suited up at fullback in one game. He got his starting position back in Week 15, but struggled in the final five games of the season, ranking second in the league with 15 penalties (13 for holding). He also had problems in the Wild Card playoff loss against the San Francisco 49ers, receiving 2 key penalties. He still managed to finish the year with the fewest pressures allowed by any Cowboy offensive lineman to start a game and surrendered only one sack.

=== Miami Dolphins ===
On March 17, 2022, Williams signed a two-year, $14 million contract with the Miami Dolphins. He was switched to center and named the starter over Michael Deiter during organized team activities. He started in all 17 games, allowing 3 sacks and 6 penalties. He was the only player to participate in 100 percent of the offensive snaps (1,057) for the team.

On June 6, 2023, Williams was not present for mandatory mini-camp with the Dolphins. Head Coach Mike McDaniel confirmed it was not an excused absence, as Williams was looking for a contract extension. During training camp, he confirmed he was "focused on football, straight on," while the Dolphins waited to make cap space. On August 8, 2023, Williams started the 2023 NFL season as the first-string center on the depth chart. On August 29, Dan Feeney was traded to the Chicago Bears, leaving Williams as the first-string center. In Week 3 against the Denver Broncos, Williams suffered a groin injury. He was marked inactive the following Sunday against the Buffalo Bills, with Liam Eichenberg replacing him. He suffered a season-ending left ACL tear in Week 14 against the Tennessee Titans and was placed on injured reserve on December 13, 2023. He appeared in 9 games during the season, allowing six quarterback pressures and one sack on 280 pass blocking snaps.

=== Seattle Seahawks ===
On August 6, 2024, Williams agreed to a one-year, $6 million contract with the Seattle Seahawks. During the offseason there were concerns about his chances to rebound from the injury, which caused the Dolphins to move on from him and sign Aaron Brewer instead. He was able to recover from his previous injury in only nine months and was named the starting center for the season opener.

On November 15, Williams abruptly retired from the NFL at 27 years old, midway through the 2024 season. He started all of his nine games and played every offensive snap at center. In his last two contests, he struggled with some errant shotgun snaps, including one that caused a 19-yard loss in Week 8. He was replaced by Olu Oluwatimi.

== Personal life ==
Williams' brother, Dalton, also played football for Stephen F. Austin and Akron. He has been outspoken about his experiences with bullies in middle school. His mother is of Mexican descent.
