= Coppell High School =

- Coppell Cowboys athletic logo

Location
- 185 West Parkway Boulevard; Coppell, Texas 75019; United States; 32.975578°N 96.99939°W

Information
- School type: Public, Secondary
- Established: 1965
- School district: Coppell Independent School District
- Superintendent: Brad Hunt
- Principal: Laura Springer
- Teaching staff: 266.25 (on an FTE basis)
- Grades: 10–12
- Enrollment: 4,066 (2024–2025)
- Student to teacher ratio: 15.28
- Colors: Red, white and Black
- Mascot: Cowboys
- Website: coppellisd.com/chs

Coppell High School is a public high school located in Coppell, Texas. It is part of the Coppell Independent School District located in extreme northwest Dallas County.

== Overview ==
The school graduated its first class of twenty-five students in 1965. As of the 2017-2018 school year, enrollment was 3,505 students in grades 9-12, however that number decreased in 2018-2019, as the school split the 9th grade to CHS9. In 2024–25 there were over 266 staff members (on an FTE basis) at Coppell High School to accommodate the student body of over 4000. Athletic teams are known as the "Cowboys" or "Cowgirls" for boys' and girls' teams, respectively. The school colors are red and black. The school slogan is #CHSRise. The principal is Laura Springer.

Coppell High School was named a 2001-02 National Blue Ribbon School of Excellence due to the new SAS class. Coppell High School has been ranked consistently as one of the "Top 1200 U.S. High Schools."

== Demographics ==
As of the 2017–2018 school year, the student population is made up of the following ethnicities out of 3,505 students.

White	36.0%
Hispanic	14.6%
African American	5.0%
Pacific Islander/Asian	40.9%
American Indian	0.4%
Two or more races	3.1%

As of the 2018-2019 school year, its student population is made up of the following grade levels: Sophomore (10), Junior (11), Senior (12)

== Recent news ==
The school's population has grown steadily in the past decade, prompting the Texas University Interscholastic League to upgrade Coppell High School from the 4A classification to 5A status for academic and athletic competition, and then again to 6A; they are currently placed in District 6-6A.

Coppell High School also changed their school schedule system starting in the 2017-2018 school year from a 7 period schedule to an 8 period modified block schedule. The exact schedule has changed year to year, but a modified block schedule employing 2 types of days with 4 classes per day on alternating "A" and "B" days is currently in place.

In 2006, Coppell High School underwent a strategic plan to unify students, staff members and the community within the large 5A school. As the strategic planning process continued in 2007, the decision was made at that point to implement thematic small learning communities, the career academies. More specifically, it allowed the students who signed up for it to attend academy specific classes that only academy students would be in and to have an elective period occupied by the chosen academy. The choices that were/are available are under the categories of the STEM (Science, Technology, Engineering, Math) Academy, the EMAC (Emerging Media and Communications) Academy, and the PSA (Public Services Academy) Academy. Freshmen and Sophomores of the 2010 class were the first students to be able to join the Academies.

As of May 2015, Coppell High School was ranked 50th in the state of Texas, and 395th nationally by US News.

== Academic achievements ==
=== Coppell Solar ===
The Coppell Solar Racing Team is a group of students from the Coppell School of Engineering that has designed, built, and raced solar cars in the national high school solar car competition since 2008. The team finished 2nd in both the 2018 cross-country race and 2019 Electric-Solar Division race at Texas Motor Speedway.

=== Speech and debate ===
The debate squad travels nationally every year. The team has members who participate in world schools debate, public forum and policy debate, including the Lincoln-Douglas debate. During the 2007-2008, 2009-2010, and 2010-2011 school years, the debate squad qualified a policy team for the Tournament of Champions (debate). During the 2011-2012 school year, one of the school's teams placed second at the 5A UIL State tournament, and the school often has students make it to elimination rounds of the TFA State tournament. In 2014, the debate squad had its top team place 7th at the National Speech and Debate Tournament for policy debate as well as qualify for the Tournament of Champions (debate). In 2019, the policy debate squad's top team placed first at the TFA State tournament and made it to elimination rounds of the 2019 Tournament of Champions (debate). The World Schools team also championed the 2023 Texas Forensic Association State tournament, the highest state achievement.

=== Health Occupations Students of America ===
The Coppell HOSA Chapter was nationally recognized as an Outstanding HOSA Chapter for the 2013–2014 school year.

The Coppell HOSA Public Service Announcement team placed first in the State Leadership Conference in Dallas, Texas (2014-2015). The team attended the NLC (National Leadership Conference) in Anaheim, California in June 2015.

=== School newspaper ===
The Sidekick newspaper at CHS is a student-led journalistic platform known for its stories, photos, videos, podcasts and graphics/page design. The Sidekick is a member of Interscholastic League Press Conference (ILPC), National Scholastic Press Association (NSPA), Southern Interscholastic Press Association (SIPA), Quill and Scroll International Honor Society and Columbia Scholastic Press Association (CSPA). For the 2019-20 school year, the program was nationally recognized as an NSPA Pacemaker, CSPA Crown and Dallas Morning News Best Website award winner, in addition to receiving ILPC Gold and Bronze Stars and numerous NSPA Best of Show Awards.

=== Student television program ===
KCBY-TV, the school's weekly media program, was nationally recognized as a Broadcast Pacemaker award winner in 2015 and 2017 by the National Scholastic Press Association. KCBY also received four Lone Star EMMY awards in November 2019 for their accomplishments in KCBY-TV and KCBY-Español.

=== Technology Student Association ===
The school's Technology Student Association (TSA) chapter participates in regional, state, and national STEM competitions. The chapter has earned multiple placements at State and National TSA Conferences over the last few years, including top finishes and finalist recognitions.

== Athletics ==
The Coppell Cowboys and Cowgirls compete in the University Interscholastic League (UIL) as 6A teams in the following sports: 12,000-capacity Buddy Echols Field is the main high school stadium.

- Baseball
- Basketball
- Cross country
- Football
- Golf
- Hockey
- Lacrosse
- Powerlifting
- Soccer
- Softball
- Swimming and diving
- Tennis
- Track and field
- Ultimate Frisbee
- Volleyball
- Wrestling

=== Lacrosse ===
Lacrosse is organized by the Texas High School Lacrosse League (THSLL) rather than the UIL. Coppell's lacrosse team has won four state THSLL championships: 2009 and 2010 in Division 2, and 2011 and 2021 in Division 1.

=== Volleyball ===
The Coppell Cowgirls volleyball team won back to back state championships in 2011 and 2012.

=== Soccer ===
The Coppell Cowboys soccer team won the 5A state championship in 2004 and 2013, and the 6A state championship in 2016. The Coppell Cowgirls soccer team won the 5A state championship in 2009, and the 6A state championship in 2015, and 2025.

=== Ultimate frisbee ===
The Coppell Cowboys Ultimate team won the USA Ultimate High School state championship in 2012 and 2013.

== Notable alumni ==
- Ryan Agarwal, basketball player for the Loyola Ramblers
- Anthony Black, professional basketball player for the Orlando Magic
- Caden Davis, college football placekicker for the Ole Miss Rebels
- Peyton Ernst, gymnast
- Laura Gao, Chinese-American comics author & artist
- Cole Green, professional baseball player
- Marcelinho Huertas, professional basketball player
- Corey Kluber, professional baseball player 2x AL Cy Young Award winner 2017 and 2014, 3x All Star
- Chloe Lanier, actress
- Jeff Lewis, singer-songwriter
- Sharon Mathai, singer
- Cam McDaniel, former college football player for the Notre Dame Fighting Irish
- Emmanuel Moody, professional football player
- Erik Nieder, Christian musician
- Febechi Nwaiwu, NFL guard for the Houston Texans
- Nico Radicic, college football placekicker for the Indiana Hoosiers
- Dan Raudabaugh, professional football player
- Thomas Rousseau, neo-fascist and founder and leader of Patriot Front
- Jad Saxton, voice actress
- Jason Stokes, professional baseball player
- Solomon Thomas, professional football player
- Chioma Ubogagu, professional soccer player
- Chiaka Ogbogu, professional women's volleyball player, USA Women's Gold Medal Team member, Tokyo Olympics 2020
- Connor Williams, professional football player
