= Doualy Xaykaothao =

American radio journalist

- Born: Vientiane
- Alma mater: Empire State University; Columbia University
- Occupation: Journalist
- Employer: Hofstra University; KERA; KPCC; Minnesota Public Radio; NPR (1999–2013)
- Awards: Knight-Bagehot Fellowship Program; Peabody Awards (2001); Edward R. Murrow Award

Doualy Xaykaothao is a Peabody and Edward R. Murrow award winning Hmong American radio journalist and freelance journalist known for her work with NPR.

== Early life ==
Xaykaothao was born in Vientiane, Laos. She is of Hmong descent. Under French colonization, her father was selected to go study in France. Once the Vietnam War began, Xaykaothao's mother moved her family to France and, eventually, the United States. Xaykaothao attended Duncanville High School.

Xaykaothao studied radio and television at Ithaca College, and earned a Bachelor of Arts in political science and African American studies from SUNY Empire. She also earned a Masters of Arts with a concentration in Business and Economics from Columbia University.

== Career ==
In 1999, Xaykaothao joined NPR as a production assistant for their radio news program, Morning Edition. In 2001, Xaykaothao was a member of the Peabody award winning Newscast Unit that covered the September 11 terrorist attacks. Later, she became a roving correspondent covering breaking news in Asia based in Seoul and Bangkok. Xaykaothao covered major stories like the effects of the 2004 Indian Ocean earthquake and tsunami in Thailand, the 2002–2004 SARS outbreak, and the Fukushima nuclear disaster. She was the first NPR reporter to reach Fukushima.

Later on, Xaykaothao left NPR to become a correspondent for Minnesota Public Radio, where she covered race, immigration, and culture.

In 2014, she became a senior reporter for KERA in Dallas. Later, she became an Annenberg Fellow for KPCC (now LAist) 89.3 in Pasadena, California. In 2018, Xaykaothao rejoined NPR.

In 2021, Xaykaothao became a Knight-Bagehot Fellow in Economics and Business journalism at Columbia University. She was awarded tuition and a $60,000 living stipend to take graduate-level courses.

In 2023, Xaykaothao became Hofstra University's professional in residence. She mentored students and community members at WRHU 88.7 in broadcast journalism.

== Awards ==
In 2001, Xaykaothao was a part of the NPR team that won a Peabody Award for their coverage of the September 11 terrorist attacks.

In 2013, Xaykaothao was recognized as an honoree for the Carnegie Corporation's Great Immigrant Great Americans program.

She also won an Edward R. Murrow award.
