= Duncanville High School =

Location
- 900 West Camp Wisdom Road; Duncanville, Texas 75116; United States; 32°39′40″N 96°55′39″W

Information
- Type: Public
- Established: 1935
- School district: Duncanville ISD
- Principal: Danny Colbert Jr.
- Staff: 239.51 (on an FTE basis)
- Grades: 9-12
- Student to teacher ratio: 19.24
- Campus type: Suburban
- Colors: Red and royal blue
- Athletics conference: 6A
- Mascot: Panther
- Website: dhs.duncanvilleisd.org

Duncanville High School is a secondary school located in Duncanville, Texas, United States, in the Dallas-Fort Worth area. The school is a part of Duncanville Independent School District.

The school includes grades 9 through 12. The high school campus is the second largest in the nation in terms of campus size. The district, and therefore the high school, serves almost all of the city of Duncanville, as well as portions of Cedar Hill, DeSoto, and a small portion of southwest Dallas.

For the 2018–2019 academic year, the school received a B grade from the Texas Education Agency.

== History ==
Duncanville High School held its first accredited graduating class in 1936. Classes moved in 1954 to a new location, now Reed Middle School. Eleven years later, it moved to its current location. Construction started on Sandra Meadows Memorial Arena in 2003. A new classroom wing was added, along with major renovations, in 2004.

== Campus ==
Duncanville High School is the second largest high school campus in the United States. The 863,137 sq ft (80,188.1 m^{2}) campus is more than twice as large as the nearby Mountain View College, and it is over the size of four combined Wal-Mart Supercenters.

== Extracurricular activities ==
=== Athletics ===
The school mascot is the Panther. With the exception of softball and girls track and field, the school has won state titles in every major team sport, including football.

The school's most notable success has been in girls' basketball, where it has won twelve state titles, including three consecutive from 1988 to 1990 while winning 134 consecutive games in the state's largest enrollment classification (a state record) before losing in the 1991 state semifinal. They also won 105 consecutive games and two consecutive state titles in 2012 and 2013. The girls teams were undefeated champions in 1989 (39-0), 1990 (37-0), 1997 (40-0), 2013 (42-0), and 2016 (39-0).

==== Basketball ====
Boys

- 1991, 1999, 2007, 2019, 2021, 2025
- Although won on the court in 2022, Duncanville was forced to forfeit the state championship game when Anthony Black was declared ineligible.

Girls

- 1976, 1988, 1989, 1990, 1997, 2003, 2012, 2013, 2016, 2017, 2020, 2024

==== Football ====
- Champion - 1998, 2022, 2023
- Runner Up - 2018, 2019, 2021, 2025

==== Baseball ====
- 1975, 1976, 1990

==== Volleyball ====
- 1995

==== Track and field ====
Boys

- 1999

==== Soccer ====
Boys

- 1986

Girls

- 1987, 1990

=== Music programs ===
Duncanville is the only 6A band program in the history of the Texas Music Educators' Association Honor Band competition to win three State Honor Band titles (1999, 2005, 2009).

==== Choral Department ====
In 2022, the Duncanville High School Choral Department was named a 2022 GRAMMY Signature School and awarded a monetary grant for the excellence of the program under the leadership of Jesse Cannon II & De'Evin Johnson. In the same school year, the Assistant Choir Director, De'Evin Johnson was named a 2023 GRAMMY Music Educator Award Quarterfinalist.

The A Cappella Men's Choir has twice performed at the National American Choral Directors Association Conference those invited performances occurred in 2012 and 2021. In 2021 the A Capella Men's Choir was also named a Foundation for Music Education- Mark of Excellence National High School Winner in the Open Class.

==== Marching Band ====
The Duncanville High School Marching Band has been the UIL state champion in 1986, 1990, and 2002.

=== Journalism ===
The school is also known for its journalism program, which publishes the Panther Tale yearbook, Panther Prints newspaper, and the district's public relations publication, Class Magazine. The yearbook and newspaper have won numerous awards, including a Robert F. Kennedy Journalism Award and Gold and Silver Crown awards from the Columbia Scholastic Press Association. For the first time in 2002, Duncanville received a Gold Crown for its newspaper and its yearbook, one of only two high schools in the nation to capture both honors that year.

== Controversies ==
A video of a student from Duncanville, 18-year-old sophomore Jeff Bliss, scolding his social studies/history teacher, went viral in May 2013, and was picked up by media. KTVT quoted the student:

You want kids to come into your class? You want them to get excited for this? You gotta come in here and make them excited. You want a kid to change and start doing better? You gotta touch his freakin' heart. Can't expect a kid to change if all you do is just tell 'em.

The video was captured on a cellphone, posted on YouTube, and picked up by Reddit, Philip DeFranco and Gawker. The official reaction of the Duncanville Independent School District was not to discipline the student, but to offer private and public reminders that there are other ways to make a point. The district issued a statement, saying, in part: "He makes a number of valid statements about how classrooms across America need to change, and we view this as an opportunity to have more conversations about transforming our schools to better meet the needs of our students."

A video of students protesting the school's strict dress code was sent to several of the local media outlets, who reported on the incident. The Duncanville Independent School District said about 170 students were found in violation of the school's dress code and sent home. The crackdown on students violating the dress code is what led to a spontaneous mass protest. Administrators responded to the protest with a large police presence on campus a day afterward, which remained until the last day of the school year.

== Notable alumni ==
- Greg Abbott, 48th Governor of Texas
- Ariel Atkins, professional basketball player in the WNBA
- Mike Bacsik, former MLB Pitcher
- Brigetta Barrett, high jumper, Olympic silver medalist
- Anthony Black, professional basketball player for the Orlando Magic
- Adam Butler, NFL player
- Tamika Catchings, Naismith Basketball Hall of Fame basketball player, 10-time WNBA All-Star, 4-time Olympic gold medalist
- Keith Creel, MLB pitcher
- Donald "Ray" Crockett, NFL player, cornerback with Denver Broncos
- Tim DeLaughter, lead singer of Tripping Daisy and The Polyphonic Spree
- Caden Durham, college football running back for the LSU Tigers
- Barry Foster, NFL running back
- Ron Holland, professional basketball player for the Detroit Pistons
- Tiffany Jackson, professional basketball player
- Grayson James, college football quarterback for the Boston College Eagles
- Jill Marie Jones, professional actress and model
- Perry Jones, current professional basketball player for Bursaspor of the Turkish Super League, and formerly the Oklahoma City Thunder
- Deja Kelly, basketball player
- Ennis Rakestraw Jr., football player for the Detroit Lions
- Jon Randall Music Artist/Producer
- Jonathan Majors, actor
- Dakorien Moore, college football wide receiver for the Oregon Ducks
- David Nied, former MLB pitcher (1992-1996)
- Greg Ostertag, professional basketball player
- Chris Owens, professional basketball player
- Micah Peavy, NBA player
- Dashaun Phillips, professional American football player, a cornerback for the Redskins, Cowboys, Jets, and Steelers of the NFL and the Renegades of the XFL, played college football for the Tarleton State Texans
- Todd Ritchie, MLB pitcher
- Steven Romo, news anchor correspondent for NBC News
- Keelon Russell, American football quarterback
- Priscilla Shirer, author and actress
- Gene Summers, singer, Rockabilly Hall of Fame inductee, 1997
- Colin Simmons, college football edge rusher for the Texas Longhorns
- Cameron Williams, college football offensive tackle for the Texas Longhorns
- Doualy Xaykaothao, journalist
