= Messy Roots =

2022 graphic memoir by Laura Gao

Messy Roots: A Graphic Memoir of a Wuhanese-American
- Author: Laura Gao
- Illustrator: Laura Gao; Weiwei Xu (colorist)
- Language: English
- Genre: Graphic novel; Memoir
- Publisher: HarperCollins
- Publication date: March 8, 2022
- Publication place: United States
- Pages: 272
- ISBN: 978-0-06-306777-6

Messy Roots: A Graphic Memoir of a Wuhanese-American is a graphic novel and memoir written and illustrated by Laura Gao, with coloring by Weiwei Xu. It was published on March 8, 2022, by HarperCollins. It originates from the comic "The Wuhan I Know," which describes the author's relationship to the city of Wuhan.

== Background ==
Gao was born in the city of Wuhan, but moved to Coppell, Texas at the age of 4. In 2021, while working for Twitter in the product development field, Gao decided to write and publish a short comic talking about life in Wuhan as a response to the beginning to the COVID-19 pandemic, which prompted the city's lockdown, and the 2021 Atlanta spa shootings. After she posted her comic on Twitter, media outlets began covering it, with the numbers of "likes" and retweets the comic received surpassing one thousand. Later, a literary agent contacted her, and she decided to write a graphic novel expanding the original comic and detailing her life.

== Creation and conception ==
To portray a lack of comfort in the United States, Gao uses duller colors, while in the sections in Wuhan she uses lighter colors. To emphasize certain portions, the comic uses the color red.

Some portions of the book detail Gao's LGBTQ identity. She revealed her orientation to her parents before she published the final graphic novel. According to Gao, the book will not likely be for sale in Mainland China due to the LGBTQ themes.

== Reception ==
Kirkus Reviews commented on the novel's intersection of Gao's different identities, and called the author's retelling of the tale of Chang'e the "[m]ost compelling" section of the novel. They concluded by praising the Gao's illustrations and Xu's coloring, and called Messy Roots "[a] nuanced representation of being Asian and transnational in the contemporary U.S." For the School Library Journal, Elise Martinez said: "A tender story of self-acceptance that lifts the story of Wuhan beyond COVID and shines light on a region with a rich culture and history."

Publishers Weekly gave Messy Roots a starred review and opened by saying Gao's debut graphic novel is "fresh, frank, and tender". They praised the book's narrative, noting the various parallels between China's culture and history and the author as a queer Chinese American. They concluded by calling the book "[a] multidimensional, thoroughly entertaining account of growing into queer Asian American identity." Jerry Dear, reviewing for The Horn Book, commented on how "Gao personalizes her experiences with insight and humor", and said Messy Roots is a "candid depiction of the universal search for one’s place in the world."
