= Northaven Trail Bridge =

Coordinates: 32°54′05″N 96°46′08″W

The Northaven Trail Bridge, or the Low Five, is an elevated pedestrian bridge located on the Northaven Trail in Dallas, Texas.

== History ==
The bridge was brought up in early 2021 as part of an expansion to the Northaven Trail that would connect with the larger Dallas trail system. Funds for the project were put at $9.3 million. On May 8, 2021, groundbreaking on the bridge commenced, and construction began.

== Description ==
The bridge has a traditional bridge design, and the elevated portion of the bridge is located above U.S. Route 75. It is the world's only net-tied arch bridge with a doubly-curved deck and skewed supports. The bridge has a structural weight of 800,000 pounds, and can withstand a maximum load of approximately 445,000 pounds. The bridge has been called the "Low Five", due to it connecting five trails (Northaven Trail, Cottonwood Creek Trail, North White Rock Creek Trail, South White Rock Creek Trail, and SoPac Trail) and due to its proximity to the High Five Interchange.

. The bridge spirals downward after crossing U.S. Route 75, looping back under itself before merging with the sidewalk below. A small parking lot is located in between the spiral.

== See also ==
- List of bridges in the United States by state
