= Laura Gao =

Chinese American comics artist

- 高宇洋
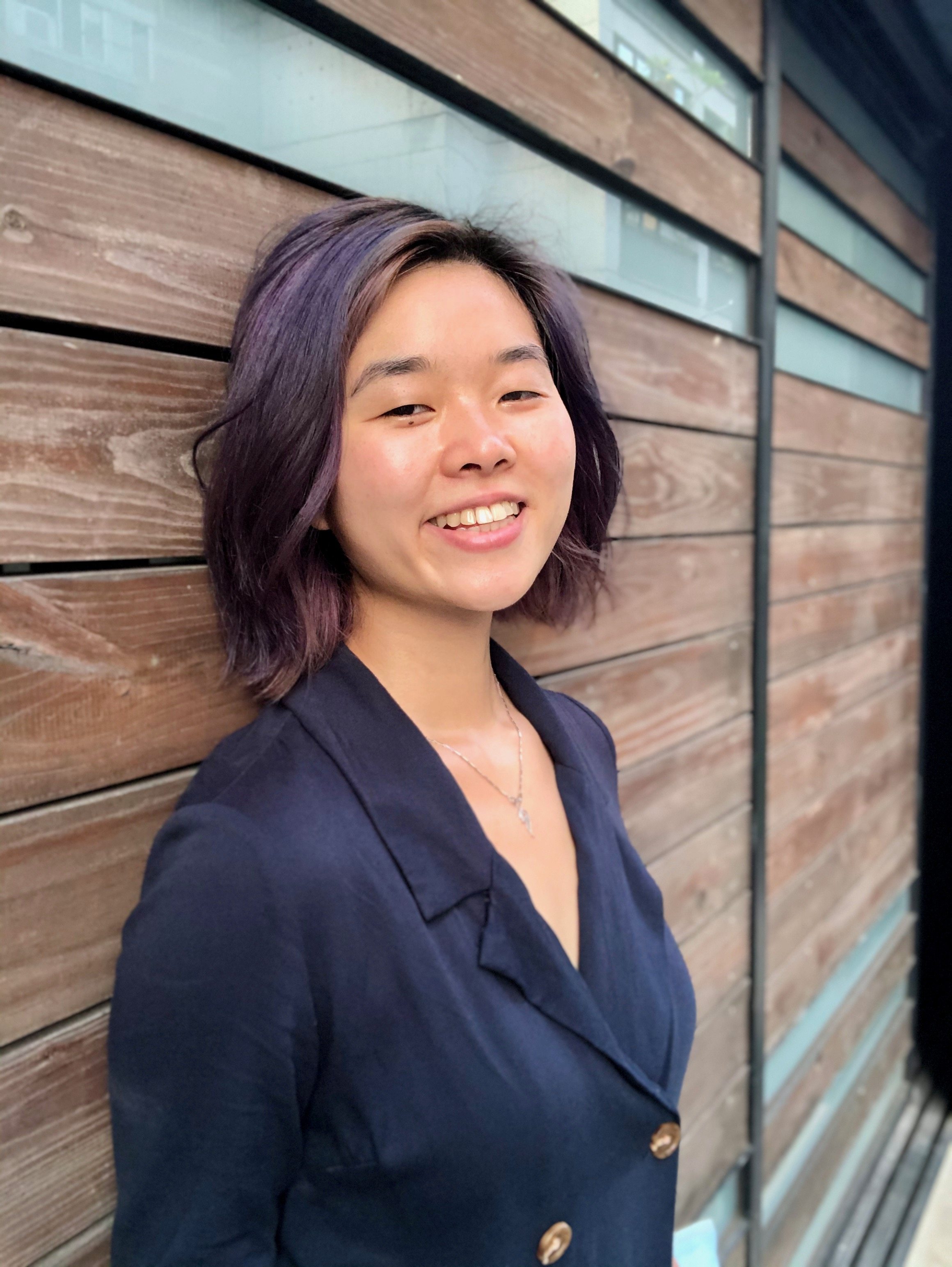
- Laura Gao in 2021
- Born: Wuhan, Hubei, China
- Education: University of Pennsylvania
- Occupations: Writer; Illustrator
- Known for: Messy Roots (creator); The Wuhan I Know (creator)
- Website: www.lauragao.com

Laura Gao (Chinese: 高宇洋; pinyin: Gāo Yǔyáng) is a Chinese-American comics artist. Gao became famous when she released a short comic called "The Wuhan I Know" in response to the growing sinophobia due to the COVID-19 pandemic. The comic was later used as the basis for her graphic memoir called Messy Roots, released in March 2022.

== Life and career ==
Gao was born as Gao Yuyang, in Wuhan, China. While her parents moved to the United States to study, she stayed at Wuhan with her grandparents until she was four years old, after which her parents were able to earn enough money to bring the rest of the family to the US. Gao received the English name "Laura" in honor of Laura Bush.

Gao grew up in Coppell, Texas, and later moved to Philadelphia to study at the University of Pennsylvania, where she attended business school. After graduating, she was hired by Twitter as a product manager and moved to San Francisco.

=== "The Wuhan I Know" ===
Gao had planned to visit her family in Wuhan early 2020, but cancelled the trip when her family told her about the spread of COVID-19 in the region. During that time, Gao noticed more people become aware of the city, mostly in a negative way, resulting in many people calling the new virus the "Wuhan virus". Wanting to show the positive aspects of the city and its culture, Gao published a comic called "The Wuhan I Know" in March 2020, which highlights the city's "history, architecture and economy", as well as some of the street foods.

The comic quickly went viral, with people all around the world contacting Gao to show their appreciation. Following the release of the comic, an animation by Twitter's creative team was created based on Gao's comic, and in July 2020, it was announced that HarperCollins had acquired the rights to two books by her: one memoir called Messy Roots and another nonfiction book about her life as a product manager, an artist and being queer. After receiving the offer for her books, Gao decided to leave her position at Twitter to focus on her work as an artist.

== Works ==
- The Wuhan I Know (comic)
- Messy Roots (graphics novel)
- Kirby’s Lessons for Falling (in love) (novel)

== See also ==
- Chinese Americans in Dallas–Fort Worth
- Chinese Americans
- COVID-19
- Wuhan, China
