= Anthony Black (basketball) =

American basketball player (born 2004)

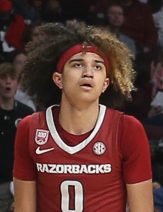
- Black with Arkansas in 2023

No. 0 – Orlando Magic
- Position: Point guard
- League: NBA

Personal information
- Born: January 20, 2004 (age 22) Duncanville, Texas, U.S.
- Listed height: 6 ft 7 in (2.01 m)
- Listed weight: 212 lb (96 kg)

Career information
- High school: Coppell (Coppell, Texas); Duncanville (Duncanville, Texas)
- College: Arkansas (2022–2023)
- NBA draft: 2023: 1st round, 6th overall pick
- Drafted by: Orlando Magic
- Playing career: 2023–present

Career history
- 2023–present: Orlando Magic

Career highlights
- McDonald's All-American (2022); Nike Hoop Summit (2022)
- Stats at NBA.com
- Stats at Basketball Reference
Medals
Men's basketball
Representing United States
FIBA Americas Under-18 Championship
Gold medal – first place	2022 Mexico	Team

Anthony Black (born January 20, 2004) is an American professional basketball player for the Orlando Magic of the National Basketball Association (NBA). He played college basketball for the Arkansas Razorbacks. He was a consensus five-star recruit and one of the top players in the 2022 class.

== Early life ==
Black was born in Duncanville, Texas, to parents Terry and Jennifer. His mother played soccer for the Texas Longhorns and Baylor Bears while his father played college basketball for the Baylor Bears and professionally overseas. When Black was 10 months old, he moved with his family to Germany where his father was playing. He became fluent in German by the age of three. Black moved back to the United States with his mother when it was time for him to begin kindergarten. His parents separated during his childhood and Black was raised by his mother and step-father, David Peavy, who also coached him in high school. His younger brother, Beckham Black, is a five-star recruit in the class of 2027 and was the first high school boys basketball player to sign a merchandising deal with ESPN.

== High school career ==
Black grew up in Coppell, Texas, and initially attended Coppell High School. He averaged 16.3 points, 6.8 rebounds, 3.5 assists and two steals per game as a junior and was named second-team all-area. Black also played football at Coppell as a wide receiver and caught 78 passes for 1,327 yards and 16 touchdowns over two varsity seasons. He transferred to Duncanville High School in Duncanville, Texas before the start of his senior year. Black played in only 15 games during his season due to eligibility issues and averaged 13.5 points, 5.8 rebounds, four assists and 2.2 steals per game.

Black was rated a five-star recruit and committed to playing college basketball for Arkansas after considering offers from Gonzaga, Oklahoma State and TCU. He also considered playing professionally in the NBA G League. Additionally, Black was considered a high-level football recruit and received scholarship offers from Texas, Baylor and Arkansas.

College recruiting
Name	Hometown	School	Height	Weight	Commit date
Anthony Black; PG / SG	Coppell, TX	Duncanville (TX)	6 ft 7 in (2.01 m)	185 lb (84 kg)	Mar 28, 2022
Anthony Black; PG / SG	Recruit ratings: Rivals: 247Sports: ESPN: (92)				
Overall recruit ranking: Rivals: 20 247Sports: 15 ESPN: 15
Note: In many cases, Scout, Rivals, 247Sports, On3, and ESPN may conflict in their listings of height and weight.; In these cases, the average was taken. ESPN grades are on a 100-point scale.; Sources: "Arkansas 2022 Basketball Commitments". Rivals.; "2022 Arkansas Razorbacks Recruiting Class". ESPN.; "2022 Team Ranking". Rivals.

== College career ==
Black entered his freshman season at Arkansas as a starter at guard. He also entered the season as a potential first-round selection in the 2023 NBA draft. Black averaged 22 points over three games during the 2022 Maui Invitational Tournament and was named the Southeastern Conference (SEC) Freshman of the Week. He was named to the SEC All-Freshman team at the end of the regular season. Black averaged 12.8 points, 5.1 rebounds, 3.9 assists, and 2.1 steals per game on the year. After the season, he announced that he would forgo the remainder of his college eligibility and enter the 2023 NBA draft.

== Professional career ==
The Orlando Magic selected Black with the sixth overall pick in the 2023 NBA draft. He was tied for the second-highest draft pick by an Arkansas Razorbacks player since the NBA was established in 1949, alongside Joe Kleine, and trailing only former 2x DPOY winner Sidney Moncrief. He was the highest draft pick for a Duncanville High School player, surpassing Greg Ostertag, who was selected 28th overall in the 1995 NBA Draft, a record that stood until Ron Holland was selected 5th overall by the Detroit the following year.

On December 26, 2023, Black recorded a career-high 23 points and 4 steals in a win against the Washington Wizards. On April 15, 2025, Black recorded 16 points off the bench and shot 3-3 from three point range in a play-in tournament victory against the Atlanta Hawks to secure the Magic a spot in the playoffs.

On November 25, 2025, Black recorded a new career-high 31 points, along with 3 assists off the bench in an Emirates NBA Cup win over the Philadelphia 76ers. On December 27, he recorded his new and current career high of 38 points in a comeback win against the Denver Nuggets.

== National team career ==
Black played for the United States under-18 basketball team at the 2022 FIBA Under-18 Americas Championship. He averaged 4.7 points, 7.8 rebounds and 4.2 assists per game, helping his team win the gold medal.

== Career statistics ==
Legend
GP	Games played	GS	Games started	MPG	Minutes per game
FG%	Field goal percentage	3P%	3-point field goal percentage	FT%	Free throw percentage
RPG	Rebounds per game	APG	Assists per game	SPG	Steals per game
BPG	Blocks per game	PPG	Points per game	**Bold**	Career high

=== NBA ===
==== Regular season ====
Year	Team	GP	GS	MPG	FG%	3P%	FT%	RPG	APG	SPG	BPG	PPG
2023–24	Orlando	69	33	16.9	**.466**	**.394**	.613	2.0	1.3	.5	.3	4.6
2024–25	Orlando	**78**	10	24.2	.423	.318	**.761**	2.9	3.1	1.1	.6	9.4
2025–26	Orlando	64	**40**	**29.8**	.447	.333	.732	**3.8**	**3.7**	**1.4**	**.7**	**15.0**
Career		211	83	23.5	.441	.338	.724	2.9	2.7	1.0	.5	9.5

==== Playoffs ====
Year	Team	GP	GS	MPG	FG%	3P%	FT%	RPG	APG	SPG	BPG	PPG
2024	Orlando	2	0	5.4	**.429**	.000	—	1.0	1.0	.5	.0	3.0
2025	Orlando	5	0	17.8	.405	.154	**.692**	**4.4**	.0	.8	.2	8.2
2026	Orlando	**7**	0	**28.0**	.370	**.318**	.619	3.1	**1.4**	**2.1**	**.7**	**8.6**
Career		14	0	21.1	.388	.243	.647	3.3	.9	1.4	.4	7.6

=== College ===
Year	Team	GP	GS	MPG	FG%	3P%	FT%	RPG	APG	SPG	BPG	PPG
2022–23	Arkansas	36	36	34.9	.453	.301	.705	5.1	3.9	2.1	.6	12.8

== Personal life ==
Black has two brothers who also play basketball: his younger brother, Beckham, and his stepbrother, Micah Peavy, who plays for the Oklahoma City Thunder.
