= Duncanville Independent School District =

School district in Texas, United States

Address
- 710 S. Cedar Ridge Dr Duncanville, Dallas County, Texas; United States

District information
- Type: Public
- Motto: Writing Success Stories, One Student at a Time.
- Grades: Pre-K – 12th grade
- Superintendent: T. Lamar Goree
- Governing agency: Texas Education Agency
- Schools: 18
- NCES District ID: 4817640

Students and staff
- Students: 11,761
- Teachers: 746.95(FTE)
- Student–teacher ratio: 15.75

Other information
- Website: https://www.duncanvilleisd.org/

Duncanville Independent School District is a school district based in Duncanville, Texas (USA).

Duncanville ISD serves almost all of the city of Duncanville and portions of DeSoto, Dallas, and Cedar Hill. The district is receiving a high number of Hispanics coming in, and a slightly decreasing number of African Americans. This can be due to the Hispanics moving in from areas such as Oak Cliff and South Dallas, and African Americans moving to areas such as Cedar Hill, DeSoto, and to a lesser extent, Midlothian.

In 2009, the school district was rated "academically acceptable" by the Texas Education Agency.

== Demographics ==
In 1997 48.62% of the district's student body was non-Hispanic white. From 1997 until 2016 the number of non-Hispanic white students declined by 87%. From 1997 to 2016 the number of students on free or reduced lunches, a way of designating someone as low income, increased by 204%. Eric Nicholson of the Dallas Observer wrote that because of the "relatively small" sizes of southern Dallas County school districts, the demographic changes were relatively more severe compared to districts in other parts of the county.

== School uniforms ==
Duncanville ISD has a mandatory school dress code policy at all of its schools since fall 2006. The Texas Education Agency specifies that the parents and/or guardians of students zoned to a school with uniforms may apply for a waiver to opt out of the uniform policy so their children do not have to wear the uniform; parents must specify "bona fide" reasons, such as religious reasons or philosophical objections.

== Schools ==
=== Secondary schools ===
==== High schools ====
Two in Duncanville

- Duncanville High School
- Pace (Alternative Private High School)
  - In 2019 it began requiring students to store cell phones during the day to increase concentration in class.
- Summit Education Center (alternative School for Duncanville ISD)

==== Middle schools ====
Two in Duncanville, one in Dallas

- W. H. Byrd Middle School (Duncanville)
- Kennemer Middle School (Dallas)
- J. Herman Reed Middle School (Duncanville)

=== Primary schools ===
==== Intermediate schools ====
Three in Duncanville

- Grace R. Brandenburg Intermediate School
- H. Bob Daniel Intermediate School
- Glenn C. Hardin Intermediate School

==== Elementary schools ====
Six in Duncanville, three in Dallas

- Charles Acton Leadership Academy (Dallas)
- S. Gus Alexander, Jr. Elementary School (Duncanville)
- Bilhartz Elementary School (Dallas)
- Central Elementary School (Duncanville)
- Fairmeadows Elementary School (Duncanville)
- Hastings Elementary School (Duncanville)
- C. J. and Anne Hyman Elementary School (Dallas)
- Merrifield Elementary School (Duncanville)
- Smith Elementary School (Duncanville)

== See also ==
- List of school districts in Texas
