= Richland Collegiate High School =

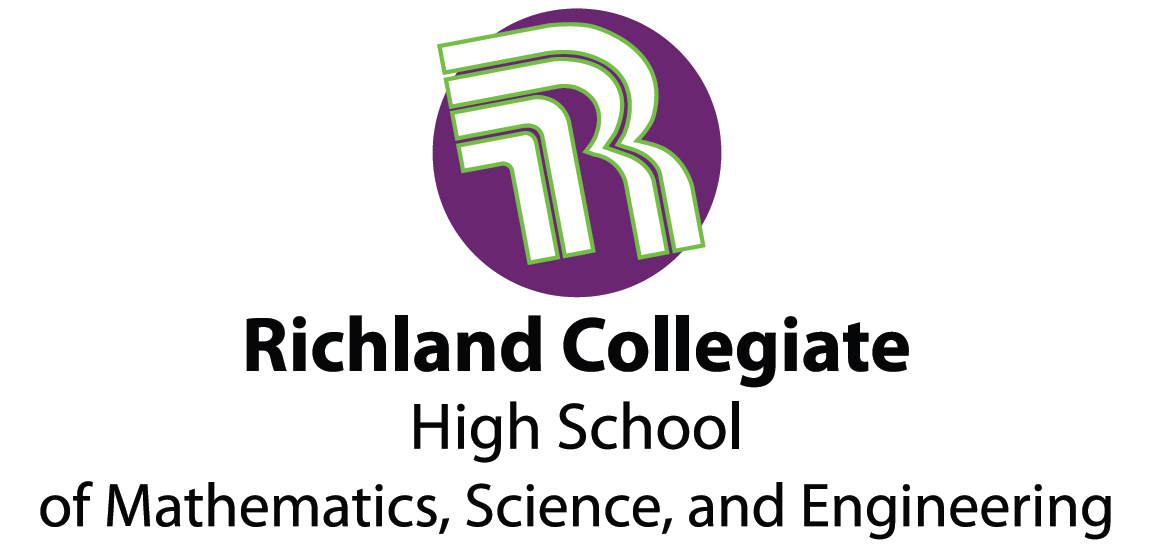

Location
- 12800 Abrams Road; Dallas, Texas; United States
- Coordinates: 32°55′17″N 96°44′06″W

Information
- Type: Charter School
- Established: 2006; 20 years ago
- School district: Dallas College; Richland Campus
- Superintendent: Nerissa Bailey
- NCES School ID: 480027111189
- Principal: Lea Ann Munkres
- Grades: 11-12
- Colors: Green and purple
- Mascot: Mobius
- Website: www.dallascollege.edu/high-school-students/rchs/pages/default.aspx

Richland Collegiate High School (RCHS) of Mathematics, Science, and Engineering is a charter high school opened in 2006 at Dallas College in Dallas, Texas.

Students can complete their last two years of high school at Dallas College, Richland Campus, taking college courses and earning college credits with a focus on mathematics, science, or engineering. RCHS students can graduate from Dallas College with an Associate of Arts or Associate of Science degree and a high school diploma, ready to transfer or enter as a first-year student to a four-year university.

The Richland Collegiate High School of Visual, Performing, and Digital Arts opened in the fall semester of 2010.
