= Coppell Independent School District =

School district in Texas, United States

Address
- 200 S. Denton Tap Road Coppell, Texas, USA ESC Region 10
- Coordinates: 32°57′56″N 96°59′39″W

District information
- Type: Independent School District
- Motto: Cowboys United: We are the CHOICE
- Grades: PK-12
- Established: 1959; 67 years ago
- Superintendent: Dr. Leanne Shivers
- Governing agency: Texas Education Agency
- Schools: 17
- NCES District ID: 4815210

Students and staff
- Students: 13,056
- Athletic conference: UIL Class AAAAAA
- District mascot: Cowboys
- Colors: Red, Black, & Gray

Other information
- Website: www.coppellisd.com

The Coppell Independent School District (Coppell ISD or CISD) is a school district based in Coppell, Texas, United States. Covering 25 square miles in Dallas County, the district includes most of Coppell and small parts of Grapevine, Irving, Dallas and Lewisville.

As of 2026, Coppell ISD operated 17 schools, including 3 high schools, 3 middle schools, 10 elementary schools, and 1 alternative campus. The district most recently received an "A" rating from the Texas Education Agency (TEA).

== Overview and History ==
The district was created as Coppell Independent School District by a vote of the local citizenry in 1959. In 1927, Dallas County Schools had acquired 6 acres (24,000 m^{2}) of land for $900 upon which to build Pinkerton Elementary, the only campus to serve Coppell children attending kindergarten through the eighth grade. At that time, the total number of students in grades K-8 was about 175.

Until the first high school was built, at what is currently the site for Coppell High School 9th Grade Campus, formerly Coppell Middle School West's building, Coppell students wishing to complete their 9th-12th grade high school education did so in Grapevine. The additional four grades were phased-in beginning with the 9th grade which was added in 1961, then 10th in 1962, 11th in 1963, and the 12th grade was added in 1964. Over the years, Coppell has remained a one high school community where Coppell High School's mascot was the "Lions." Once the newly formed professional football team located nearby, the mascot was changed to the Coppell "Cowboys" and has remained so ever since.

Student growth in the district averaged over 16% from the mid-eighties through the late nineties. Today, as the largest employer in Coppell with over 1200 employees, Coppell ISD has fifteen campuses serving nearly 10,000 students in grades K-12 including ten at the elementary level, three middle schools, two high school, and an alternative campus. The CISD has opened a new technically oriented high school, called New Tech High @ Coppell, in the fall of 2008.

Coppell is ranked twelfth among "The Best Places to Live in Dallas" with mean SAT scores earning them third place among 62 suburbs (D Magazine 7/06).

Coppell ISD is ranked #1 in school districts in Texas over 10,000 students for Gold Performance Acknowledgments (GPAs) in 2006. Eighty two acknowledgments for high achievement were awarded across the district by TEA. For the fourth year in a row, CISD has received a Superior Achievement rating based on answering "yes" to each of the 21 indicators included in the Financial Integrity Rating System of Texas (FIRST) program.

In 2022, the school district was accused of tolerating racism and bullying against minority students.

== Schools ==
=== High Schools (Grades 9-12) ===
- Coppell High School (opened in 1961)
  - 2001-2002 National Blue Ribbon School
- New Tech High @ Coppell (opened in 2009)
- Coppell High School - Ninth Grade Campus (opened in 2018)

=== Middle Schools (Grades 6-8) ===
- Coppell Middle School - East (opened in 1986)
  - 1999-2000 National Blue Ribbon School
- Coppell Middle School - North (opened in 1998)
- Coppell Middle School - West (opened in 1979
  - 1994-96 National Blue Ribbon School

=== Elementary Schools (Grades K-5) ===
- Austin Elementary (opened in 1987)
- Cottonwood Creek Elementary (opened in 1996)
- Canyon Ranch Elementary (opened in 2019)
- Denton Creek Elementary (opened in 1998)
- Lakeside Elementary (opened in 1993)
- Mockingbird Elementary (opened in 1991)
- Pinkerton Elementary (opened in 1927, closed in 2025)
- Richard J. Lee Elementary (opened in 2014)
- Town Center Elementary (opened in 1994)
- Valley Ranch Elementary (opened in 1996)
- Wilson Elementary (opened in 1992)
  - 1998-99 National Blue Ribbon School

=== Alternative Education (DAEP/AEP) ===
- Education Annex

== Demographics ==
From 1997 to 2016, the number of students considered to be economically disadvantaged increased by more than 200%

The non-Hispanic white population increased from 1997 until 2003, when it had the highest ever number of that racial demographic, From 2003 to 2016, according to Eric Nicholson of the Dallas Observer, after 2003 that figure "began a steady decline". According to Nicholson, the district had not faced white flight as severe as other Dallas County school districts.

As of 2022 the student population is 51.6% Asian, 27.6% White, 13.2% Hispanic/Latino, 4.2% Black, 3.1% Two or More Races, 0.3% American Indian, and 0.1% Pacific Islander.

== See also ==
- Coppell Education
- List of school districts in Texas
