= Dallas Park and Recreation Department =

Government agency

The Dallas Park and Recreation Department is the department of the Government of Dallas responsible for maintaining the city's parks system, preserving and maintaining the ecological diversity of the city's natural areas, and furnishing recreational opportunities for city's residents and visitors.

The park system was established in 1876, with the first park being City Park, adjacent to Browder Springs. The park was located a mile southeast of the Dallas County Courthouse.
