= Coppell, Texas =

City of Coppell, Texas
- City
- Location of Coppell in Dallas County, Texas
- Coordinates: 32°57′47″N 96°59′50″W
- Country: United States
- State: Texas
- Counties: Dallas, Denton

Government
  - Type: Council-Manager

Area
  - Total: 14.73 sq mi (38.15 km^{2})
  - Land: 14.41 sq mi (37.33 km^{2})
  - Water: 0.31 sq mi (0.81 km^{2}) 2.00%
- Elevation: 512 ft (156 m)

Population (2020)
  - Total: 42,983
  - Estimate (2021): 41,290
  - Density: 2,873.5/sq mi (1,109.47/km^{2})
- Demonym: Coppellite
- Time zone: UTC-6 (CST)
  - Summer (DST): UTC-5 (CDT)
- ZIP codes: 75019
- Area codes: 214, 469, 945, 972
- FIPS code: 48-16612
- GNIS feature ID: 2410224
- Website: www.coppelltx.gov

Coppell (/kəˈpɛl/ kə-PEL) is a city in the northwest corner of Dallas County in the U.S. state of Texas. It is a suburb of Dallas and a bedroom community in the Dallas–Fort Worth metroplex. Its population was 42,983 at the 2020 census. A small area in the far northern portion of the city extends into neighboring Denton County.

== History ==
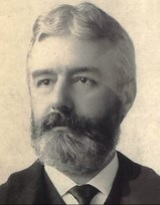
George Coppell

The Coppell area was settled by German and French immigrants in the 1840s. Members of the Peters Colony also settled there in the 1840s. Originally named Gibbs Station, after Barnett Gibbs (one of Texas's first lieutenant governors), the town was renamed in 1892 for George Coppell, a New York banker, who was born in Liverpool, England and probably moved to the United States circa 1859. He was reportedly heavily involved with the final construction of the local railroad line. Popular belief is that he was an engineer, but little or no evidence supports that claim.

In 1955, the community was incorporated through a ballot measure that passed by a vote of 41 to 1. Spurred by the opening of Dallas/Fort Worth International Airport (DFW Airport) in 1974, the city was radically transformed from a tiny farming village to a large, upper-middle class suburban community in the 1980s and 1990s. By 2000, almost all of the residentially zoned land in the city was developed, and the population grew to over 35,000. In addition to suburban homes, the city has a growing commercial base of warehouses and transportation centers on the south and west sides of the city, closest in proximity to the airport.

== Geography ==
According to the United States Census Bureau, the city has a total area of 14.7 square miles (38.0 km^{2}), of which 14.4 square miles (37.3 km^{2}) are land and 0.31 square miles (0.8 km^{2}), or 2.00%, is covered by water.

Coppell occupies the northwest corner of Dallas County and lies in proximity to DFW Airport. A portion of the airport property is within the city limits of Coppell. It is bordered on the west by Grapevine, on the north by Lewisville, on the east by Carrollton, and on the south by Irving and Dallas.

== Demographics ==
Historical population
Census	Pop.	Note	%±
1960	666		—
1970	1,728		159.5%
1980	3,826		121.4%
1990	16,881		341.2%
2000	35,958		113.0%
2010	38,659		7.5%
2020	42,983		11.2%
2023 (est.)	41,404		−3.7%
U.S. Decennial Census

=== 2020 census ===
As of the 2020 census, Coppell had a population of 42,983. The median age was 39.7 years. 26.7% of residents were under the age of 18 and 10.5% of residents were 65 years of age or older. For every 100 females there were 95.1 males, and for every 100 females age 18 and over there were 91.2 males age 18 and over.

100.0% of residents lived in urban areas, while 0% lived in rural areas.

There were 15,009 households in Coppell, of which 44.3% had children under the age of 18 living in them. Of all households, 65.8% were married-couple households, 11.0% were households with a male householder and no spouse or partner present, and 19.8% were households with a female householder and no spouse or partner present. About 17.3% of all households were made up of individuals and 5.9% had someone living alone who was 65 years of age or older.

There were 15,498 housing units, of which 3.2% were vacant. Among occupied housing units, 70.1% were owner-occupied and 29.9% were renter-occupied. The homeowner vacancy rate was 0.8% and the rental vacancy rate was 6.2%.

Racial composition as of the 2020 census
Race	Number	Percent
White	22,261	51.8%
Black or African American	2,310	5.4%
American Indian and Alaska Native	178	0.4%
Asian	11,661	27.1%
Native Hawaiian and Other Pacific Islander	26	0.1%
Some other race	1,708	4.0%
Two or more races	4,839	11.3%
Hispanic or Latino (of any race)	5,962	13.9%

=== 2019 American Community Survey ===
As of the 2019 American Community Survey 5-year estimates, the median income for a household in the city was $122,340, and for a family was $141,867. Males had a median income of $87,484 versus $46,038 for females. The per capita income for the city was $41,645. About 2.1% of families and 2.6% of the population were below the poverty line, including 3.7% of those under age 18 and 2.3% of those age 65 or over.

== Economy ==
Coppell's economy relies largely on its proximity to DFW Airport, which is directly to its southwest and accessible by several highways and surface routes. As such, many corporations have shipping and distribution facilities in a large commercial zone comprising the southwestern section of the city, among them Amazon, Avaya, Nokia, IBM, The Container Store, Uline and Mohawk Industries. Fortune 1000 financial services and mortgage firm Mr. Cooper is headquartered in the Cypress Waters development, a neighboring exclave of the city of Dallas. In March 2010, Samsung opened a new cell-phone manufacturing and distribution facility in the city. Anime distributor Funimation (now known as Crunchyroll) moved to the new Cypress Waters development on Olympus Boulevard in late 2021.

== Sports ==
Coppell is home to the gymnastics club Texas Dreams Gymnastics. The club has coached Peyton Ernst and Bailie Key and has a strong team of upcoming level 10 gymnasts. The head coach is former Olympian, and the first American "All Around" World Champion Gold Medalist 1991, Kim Zmeskal Burdette. Coppell also is known for their soccer association, the Coppell Youth Soccer Association. The organization has been developing youth in the sport at the recreational and competitive level.

== Education ==
Coppell residents are served by one of four school districts.

Coppell Independent School District (CISD) is responsible for the kindergarten–grade 12 education of the majority of the City of Coppell's children. A portion of the CISD also covers parts of north Irving in the Valley Ranch area and those portions of Lewisville that fall south of the current Dallas/Denton County boundary. Its high schools are Coppell High School and the more recently opened New Tech High.

Carrollton-Farmers Branch ISD serves easternmost Coppell, south of Sandy Lake Rd. and to the east of Macarthur Blvd., including the Riverchase area, and students matriculate to Barbara Bush Middle School and Ranchview High School in Irving. A portion of Coppell in Dallas County is within Grapevine-Colleyville Independent School District.

Lewisville ISD serves the northernmost section of Coppell falling in Denton County, including the Coppell Greens subdivision. This area is north of State Highway 121.

All of the elementary schools in the Coppell Independent School District are rated "exemplary" by the Texas Education Agency (in 2008), as are Coppell Middle School North and Coppell Middle School East. Coppell Middle School West, Coppell High School, and the district as a whole are rated "recognized". New Tech High received an "exemplary" ranking in its first year, the 2008–2009 school year. Riverchase Elementary (in the Carrollton-Farmers Branch Independent School District, but located in Coppell) is rated "recognized". Students from that school go on to attend the Barbara Bush Middle School and Ranchview High School in neighboring Valley Ranch. They are rated "academically acceptable" and "recognized", respectively.

The Coppell ISD was ranked as the top music program in the United States by the Music Educators Association in 2000. In August 2001, Coppell voters approved a sales tax increase to provide funding for arts in the school district. The Coppell High School Marching Band won the Texas 4A UIL championship in 1999 and finished third in 5A in 2009. The Coppell Middle School North Band won the Texas state championship in 2006, 2011, and 2016. The Coppell Middle School East band finished fourth in state in 2011.

Coppell High School's news program, KCBY-TV, has won several national awards for their work with video production. The KCBY broadcast department features local stories reaching out to the community in the school, as well as the community outside of school. The KCBY sports department offers a live broadcast of all of the athletic home games. The Head of KCBY is Irma Kennedy, who had worked with NBC prior to taking the job. In the summer of 2010, KCBY got an estimated $500,000 worth of new equipment, as it prepared to take on the challenges of a live broadcast in spring 2011. The news program also features a movie-related segment every week featuring new upcoming movies and more. "KCBY Coppell". February 2024.

New Tech High at Coppell’s film program, NT Fuze, has had several of its productions accepted to major film festivals, including South by Southwest and the Dallas International Film Festival. NT Fuze provides students a chance to learn the art of filmmaking and use the latest production tools. NT Fuze produces quality content not only for New Tech and Coppell ISD, but also for local businesses and organizations.

== Transportation ==
Coppell is next to the northeast corner of DFW Airport. No freeways go directly through the city, but the entire perimeter is served by SH121 and the Sam Rayburn Tollway (west and north), Interstate 635 (south), and the President George Bush Turnpike and Interstate 35E (east).

Coppell offers ADA-compliant paratransit through an agreement with SPAN Transit, based in neighboring Denton County.

Coppell has no general-use public transportation. It was a charter member of Dallas Area Rapid Transit (DART), but voters elected to withdraw from DART in 1989. This election remains controversial today, as the city had a much smaller population in the 1980s. Since Coppell borders DART member cities Carrollton, Dallas, and Irving, it can rejoin at a later date if it wishes, but implementing the mandatory 1% sales tax would require cutting other city services.

DART's Silver Line commuter rail system passes through Coppell. While Coppell's lack of membership means that a station cannot be built in it, the Cypress Waters station is located in an exclave of Dallas that borders Coppell. It is unclear whether Coppell will connect to the station via transit, which would require making a special agreement with DART or a third-party transit provider.

== Notable people ==
- Hannah Bilka, hockey player, current member of American national women's team.
- Anthony Black, NBA basketball player for the Orlando Magic.
- Ashley Cain, two-time U.S. figure skating pairs champion
- Kim Chung-ha, Korean solo artist, former member of K-pop girl group I.O.I
- Kelli Finglass, director of the Dallas Cowboys Cheerleaders
- Laura Gao (cartoonist, author of Messy Roots)
- Veronica Hults, former national gymnast
- Corey Kluber, two-time Cy Young Award winner, pitcher for the Tampa Bay Rays, former pitcher for the New York Yankees
- Chiaka Ogbogu, professional volleyball player, gold medalist in women's indoor volleyball at the 2020 Summer Olympics
- Bennett Ratliff, member of the Texas House of Representatives from Coppell (2013–2015)
- Keri Russell, television and film actress
- Solomon Thomas, defensive tackle for the Dallas Cowboys
- Tom Thompson, oldest football player in NCAA history
- Connor Williams, offensive lineman for the Miami Dolphins
- Jeffery Xiong, chess grandmaster
