= Minnesota State Highway 171 =

State highway in Minnesota, United States

Trunk Highway 171
- MN 171 highlighted in red

Route information
- Maintained by MnDOT
- Length: 1.886 mi (3.035 km)
- Existed: 1950s–present

Major junctions
- West end: ND 59 at the Red River in St. Vincent
- East end: US 75 at St. Vincent Township

Location
- Country: United States
- State: Minnesota
- Counties: Kittson

Highway system
- Minnesota Trunk Highway System; Interstate; US; State; Legislative; Scenic
← MN 169	→ MN 172

Minnesota State Highway 171 (MN 171) is a 1.886-mile-long (3.035 km) short highway in the northwest corner of Minnesota, which runs from North Dakota Highway 59 at the North Dakota state line and continues east to its eastern terminus at its intersection with U.S. Highway 75 near St. Vincent. The route passes through St. Vincent.

== Route description ==
State Highway 171 serves as a short east–west route between U.S. 75, St. Vincent, the Red River, and Pembina, ND.

The route is located in the Red River Valley region.

The route is legally defined as Route 171 in the Minnesota Statutes.

== History ==
Highway 171 was authorized on April 22, 1933 and was originally part of State Highway 73.

By 1935, this route was renumbered as part of U.S. Highway 59. Adjoining North Dakota Highway 59 in Pembina was numbered to match then-Highway 59 in Minnesota.

In the 1950s, this route was renumbered 171 when a realigned U.S. 59 was constructed from Lancaster north to Canada.

This route was paved (as U.S. 59) by 1940.

Since 2003, Canada-bound traffic on nearby U.S. 75 has been directed to follow State Highway 171 west into North Dakota, where it becomes North Dakota Highway 59, which intersects I-29 to Canada. In 2006, the closure became official of the nearby Noyes border crossing on U.S. 75. Minnesota and North Dakota have not yet petitioned AASHTO officials to change the definition of U.S. 75 to follow the routing of 171 and ND 59. As of 2019, nearby U.S. 75 in Minnesota is still signed to what is now a dead-end at the old Noyes border crossing.

== Major intersections ==
The entire route is in Kittson County.

Location	mi	km	Destinations	Notes
Red River of the North	0.000	0.000	ND 59 west	Continuation into Pembina, North Dakota
Red River of the North	0.000	0.000	Minnesota–North Dakota line	
St. Vincent Township	1.886	3.035	US 75 – Hallock, Noyes	Eastern terminus
1.000 mi = 1.609 km; 1.000 km = 0.621 mi
