= North Dakota Highway 59 =

State highway in North Dakota, U.S.

North Dakota Highway 59
- ND 59 highlighted in red

Route information
- Maintained by NDDOT
- Length: 1.063 mi (1.711 km)
- Existed: c. 1953–present

Major junctions
- West end: I-29 / US 81 / CR 55 in Pembina
- East end: MN 171 at the Minnesota state line in Pembina

Location
- Country: United States
- State: North Dakota
- Counties: Pembina

Highway system
- North Dakota State Highway System; Interstate; US; State
← ND 58	→ ND 60

North Dakota Highway 59 (ND 59) is a state highway located entirely within Pembina County that connects Interstate 29 (I-29) and U.S. Route 81 (US 81) on the west side of Pembina, to Minnesota State Highway 171 (MN 171) at the Minnesota state line at the Red River.

The entire route runs along the western and northern edges of Pembina as a two lane highway.

== Route description ==
ND 59 starts at a diamond interchange with I-29 on the western edge of Pembina. It turns north and follows the western and northern edges of the small town, acting as a bypass to through traffic. The route the crosses a bridge over the Red River, crossing the Minnesota state line and continuing east as MN 171.

== History ==
ND 59, along with adjoining MN 171, was formerly part of U.S. Highway 59 (US 59), being assigned the designation in 1935. In the 1950s, US 59 was rerouted onto a new alignment from Lancaster, Minnesota north to a new border crossing with Canada. While a new designation of MN 171 was given to a section of the former route, ND 59 was relinquished to a state highway, though it kept its old route number of 59 and has not changed since.

Since 2003, Canada-bound traffic on nearby US 75 has been directed to follow MN 171 west into North Dakota, and ND 59 to connect to I-29 to access Canada. In 2006, the closure became official of the nearby Noyes border crossing on US 75, leaving it a dead end.

== Major intersections ==
The entire route is in Pembina, Pembina County.

mi	km	Destinations	Notes
0.000	0.000	I-29 / US 81 – Grand Forks, Winnipeg	Western terminus, I-29 exit 215
1.063	1.711	MN 171 east – US 75	Eastern terminus
1.000 mi = 1.609 km; 1.000 km = 0.621 mi
