= Border checkpoint =

Passage point on an international border

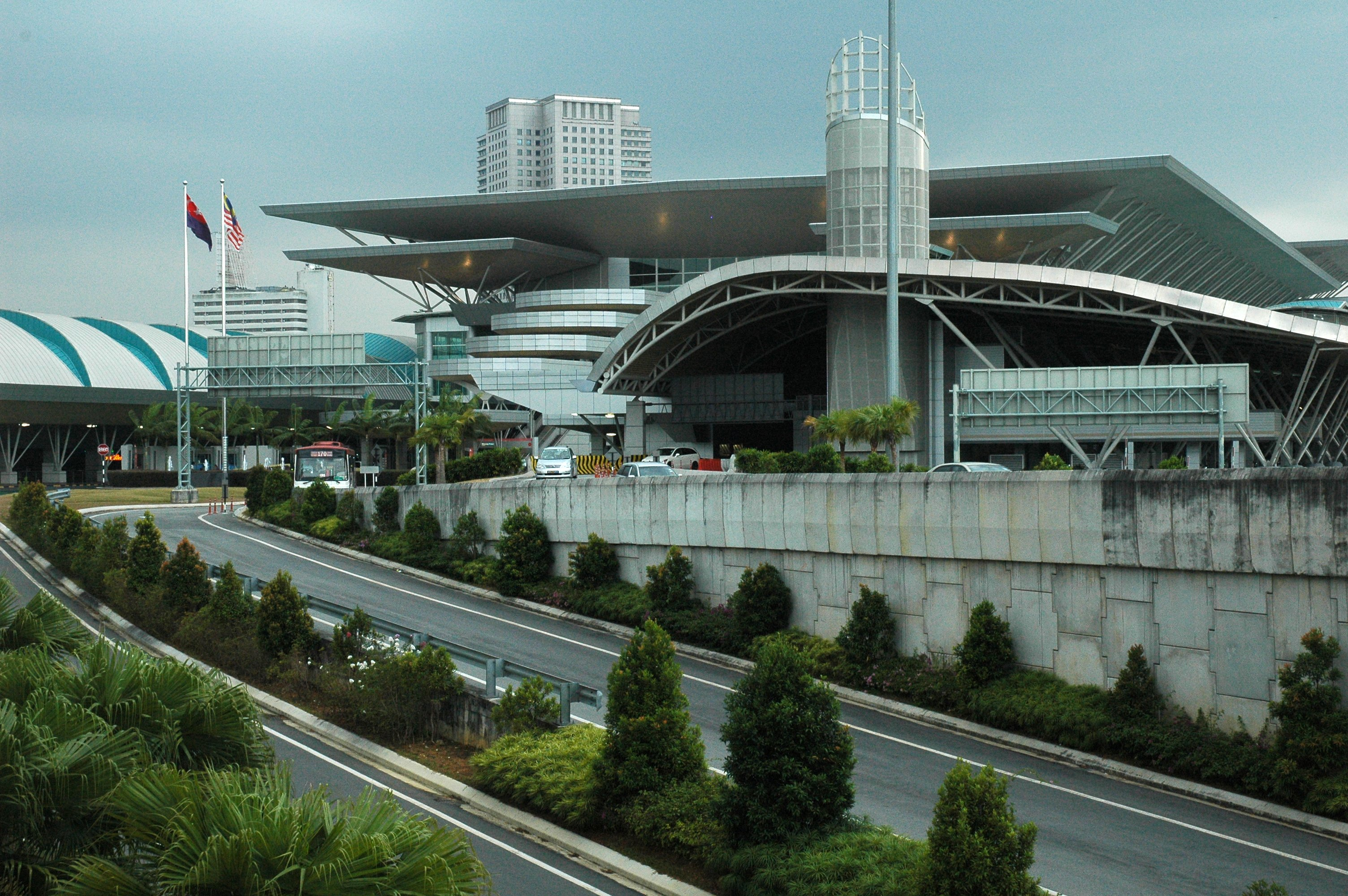
Sultan Iskandar Building in Johor Bahru, Malaysia–Singapore border

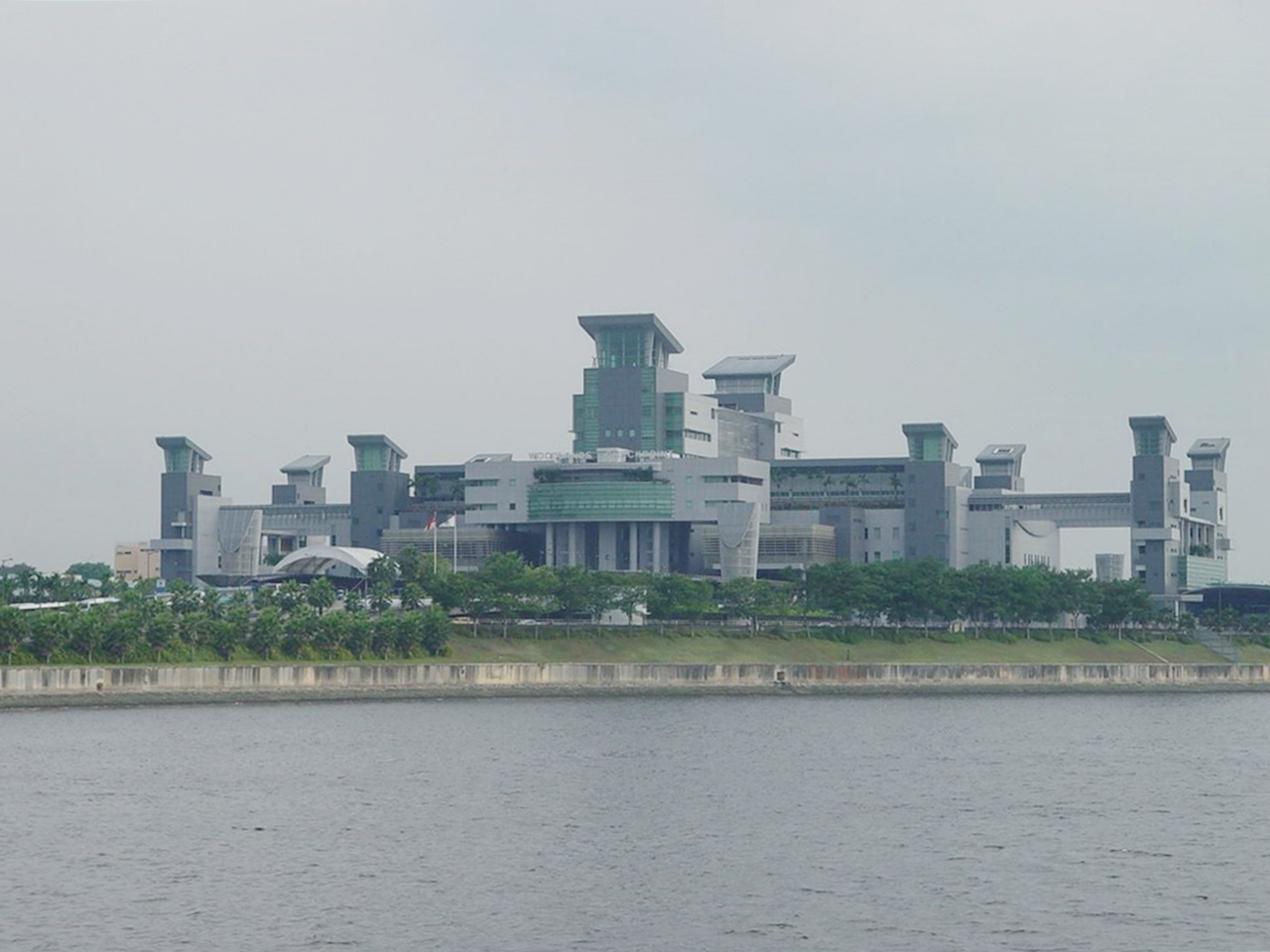
Woodlands Checkpoint, Malaysia–Singapore border

The Malaysia–Singapore border handles the busiest international land border crossing in the world, with 350,000 travellers daily.

A border checkpoint is a location on an international border where travelers or goods are inspected and allowed (or denied) passage through. Authorization often is required to enter a country through its borders. Access-controlled borders often have a limited number of checkpoints where they can be crossed without legal sanctions. Arrangements or treaties may be formed to allow or mandate less restrained crossings (e.g. the Schengen Agreement). Land border checkpoints (land ports of entry) can be contrasted with the customs and immigration facilities at seaports, international airports, and other ports of entry.

Checkpoints generally serve two purposes:

- To prevent entrance of individuals who are either undesirable (e.g. criminals or others who pose threats) or simply unauthorized to enter.
- To prevent entrance of goods that are illegal or subject to restriction, or to collect tariffs.

Checkpoints are usually staffed by a uniformed service (sometimes referred to as customs service or border patrol agents).

In some countries (e.g. China) there are border checkpoints for both those entering and those exiting the country, while in others (e.g. U.S. and Canada), there are border checkpoints only when entering the country.

== Definitions in European Union (Schengen) law ==
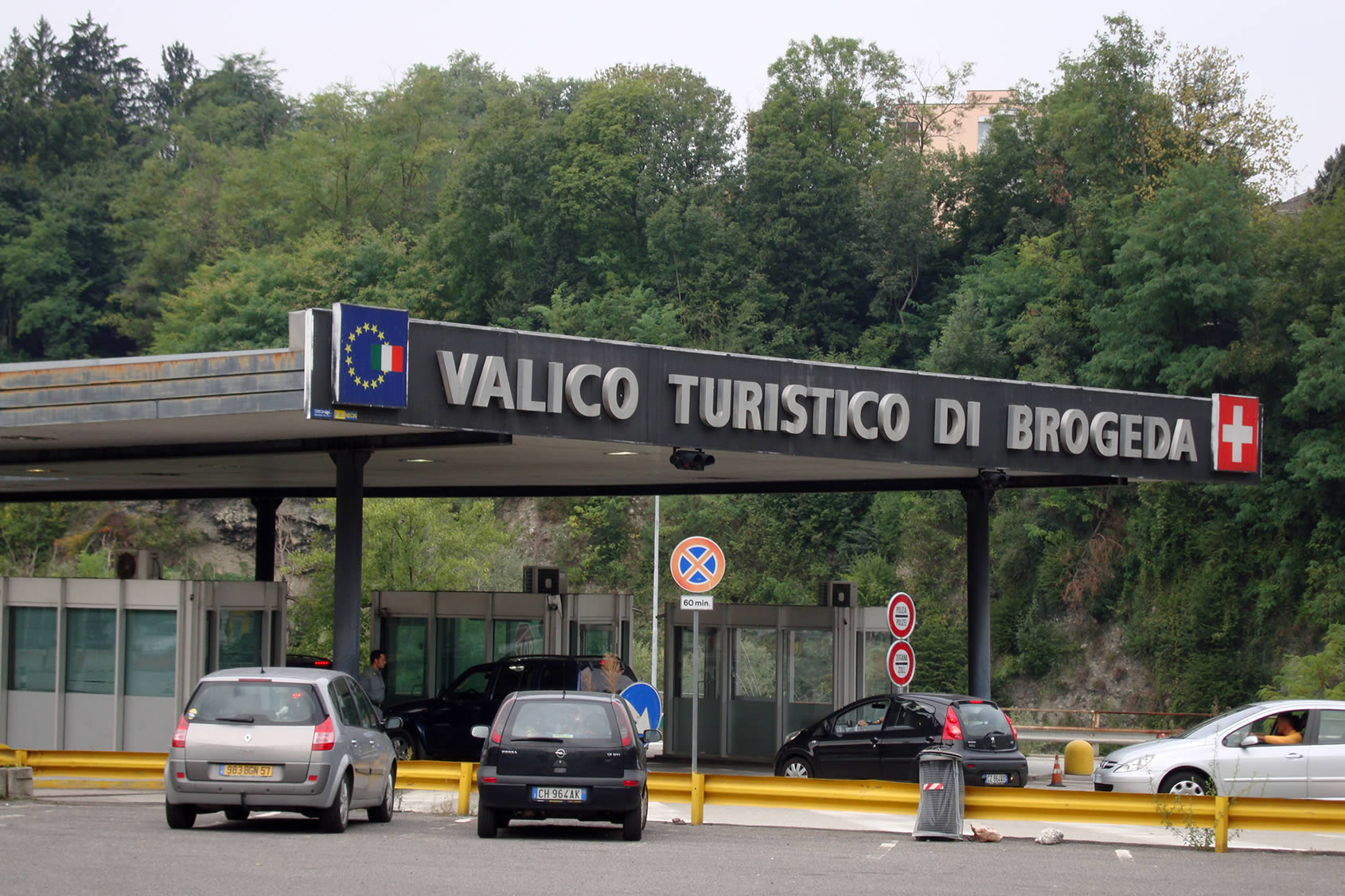
Italian-Swiss border post – since Switzerland joined the Schengen Area in 2008, this checkpoint is solely for customs formalities

The Schengen Borders Code, which forms part of the law of the European Union, defines some terms as follows (particularities with respect to the EU are left out, in order to emphasize general usability of those definitions):

- "Border crossing point" means any crossing point authorized by the competent authorities for the crossing of external borders (Article 2 sec. 8 of the Schengen Borders Code);
- "Border control" means the activity carried out at a border, [...] in response exclusively to an intention to cross or the act of crossing that border, regardless of any other consideration, consisting of border checks and border surveillance (Article 2 sec. 9 of the Schengen Borders Code);
- "Border checks" means the checks carried out at border crossing points, to ensure that persons, including their means of transport and the objects in their possession, may be authorised to enter the territory [...] or authorised to leave it (Article 2 sec. 10 of the Schengen Borders Code);
- "Border surveillance" means the surveillance of borders between border crossing points and the surveillance of border crossing points outside the fixed opening hours, in order to prevent persons from circumventing border checks (Article 2 sec. 10 of the Schengen Borders Code).
- "Second line check" means a further check which may be carried out in a special location away from the location at which all persons are checked (first line)

These definitions mean that a place where a road crosses an internal Schengen border is legally not a "border crossing point".

== Busiest checkpoints in the world ==
=== Land ===
This is a list of the busiest land border checkpoints in the world, handling more than 35 million travelers in both directions annually. These travelers (or individual crossings) comprise pedestrians, drivers and vehicle passengers. International border checkpoints are in green.

Notes:

- As the United States does not have border checkpoints for outgoing traffic, incoming traffic figures are doubled to give a fair comparison. See detailed notes in table.
- El Paso Port of Entry has been excluded, as its total represents the sum of six individual checkpoints at the end of six separate bridges, with no single checkpoint meeting the minimum number of crossings required for this list.

Rank	Border checkpoints				Annual Travelers	Notes
1	Gongbei Port	China	Macau	Posto Fronteiriço das Portas do Cerco	134,000,000	(2018)
2	Sultan Iskandar Building	Malaysia	Singapore	Woodlands Checkpoint	127,750,000	(2012) (Note: Sultan / Woodlands: sum of 2012 daily average)
3	Luohu Port	China	Hong Kong	Lo Wu Control Point	81,707,959	(2017)
4	Puerto Fronterizo El Chaparral	Mexico	United States of America	San Ysidro Port of Entry	69,300,000	(2018) (Note: San Diego / Tijuana: Northbound individual crossings are recorded, as listed in a workbook Archived 2019-07-15 at the Wayback Machine by the USDOT. As southbound border crossings counts are not formally produced and publicly available, it is estimated that a similar number of crossings occurs from San Diego to Tijuana, as has previously been done in a report Archived 2021-04-29 at the Wayback Machine by the SANDAG. Since this is an estimate, the resulting figure has been rounded off to the nearest 100,000.)
5	Futian Port	China	Hong Kong	Lok Ma Chau Spur Line Control Point	59,464,480	(2017)
6	Shenzhen Bay Port	China	Hong Kong	Shenzhen Bay Control Point	45,118,797	(2017)
7	Huanggang Port	China	Hong Kong	Lok Ma Chau Control Point	37,059,848	(2017)
8	Puerto Fronterizo Mesa de Otay	Mexico	United States of America	Otay Mesa Port of Entry	35,400,000	(2018)

=== Air ===
This is a list of the busiest airports in the world, by international passenger traffic, as of 2018. Airports serving international passengers are effectively checkpoints, and have the proper customs, immigration and quarantine facilities. Airports Council International's (January–December) preliminary figures are as follows.

Rank	Airport		Annual Passengers
1	Dubai International Airport	United Arab Emirates	88,885,367
2	London Heathrow Airport	United Kingdom	75,306,939
3	Hong Kong International Airport	Hong Kong	74,360,976
4	Amsterdam Airport Schiphol	Netherlands	70,956,258 (Note: Schengen Area: This airport or seaport is located in the Schengen Area, in which internal border checks have largely been abolished (particularly land borders), though there can be temporary checkpoints or passport requirements at check in. Thus, flights/ships within the area may have a large number of international passengers travel wholly within this area without passing through permanent border checkpoints within the airport or seaport facility, with those passengers potentially counted in domestic totals. The figures for airports and seaports in these tables represent international passengers, per breakdown data supplied by Airports Council International, and it is unclear whether these figures include or exclude intra-Schengen Area passengers as international.)
5	Seoul Incheon International Airport	South Korea	67,676,147
6	Paris-Charles de Gaulle Airport	France	66,383,494
7	Singapore Changi Airport	Singapore	64,890,000
8	Frankfurt Airport	Germany	61,774,663
9	Suvarnabhumi Airport	Thailand	50,868,846
10	Atatürk International Airport	Turkey	48,978,770

=== Sea ===
This is a list of the busiest seaports in the world, with proper customs, immigration and quarantine facilities to be deemed as maritime checkpoints. Although figures simply represent total passenger traffic, most (if not, all) of the passengers served at these ports are bound for other countries and have to pass through checkpoint (i.e. the port is not a domestic one). This list only includes ports that handle more than 4 million passengers annually.

Note:

- The four passenger ports in China, Hong Kong and Macau in this list operate services to and from each other. These passenger ports are effectively checkpoints, as they have the proper customs, immigration and quarantine facilities.

Rank	Port		Annual Passengers	Notes
1	Taipa Ferry Terminal	Macau	24,000,000	(2017) (Note: Taipa Ferry Terminal: annual average of 2013 to 2017 five year total)
2	Hong Kong–Macau Ferry Terminal	Hong Kong	17,317,037	(2017)
3	Outer Harbour Ferry Terminal	Macau	15,000,000	(2013)
4	Port of Helsinki	Finland	12,300,000	(2017)
5	Port of Dover	United Kingdom	11,700,000	(2017)
6	Hong Kong-China Ferry Terminal	Hong Kong	7,074,940	(2017)
7	PortMiami	USA	4,800,000	(2017)
8	Port Canaveral	USA	4,500,000	(2016)

== Gallery ==
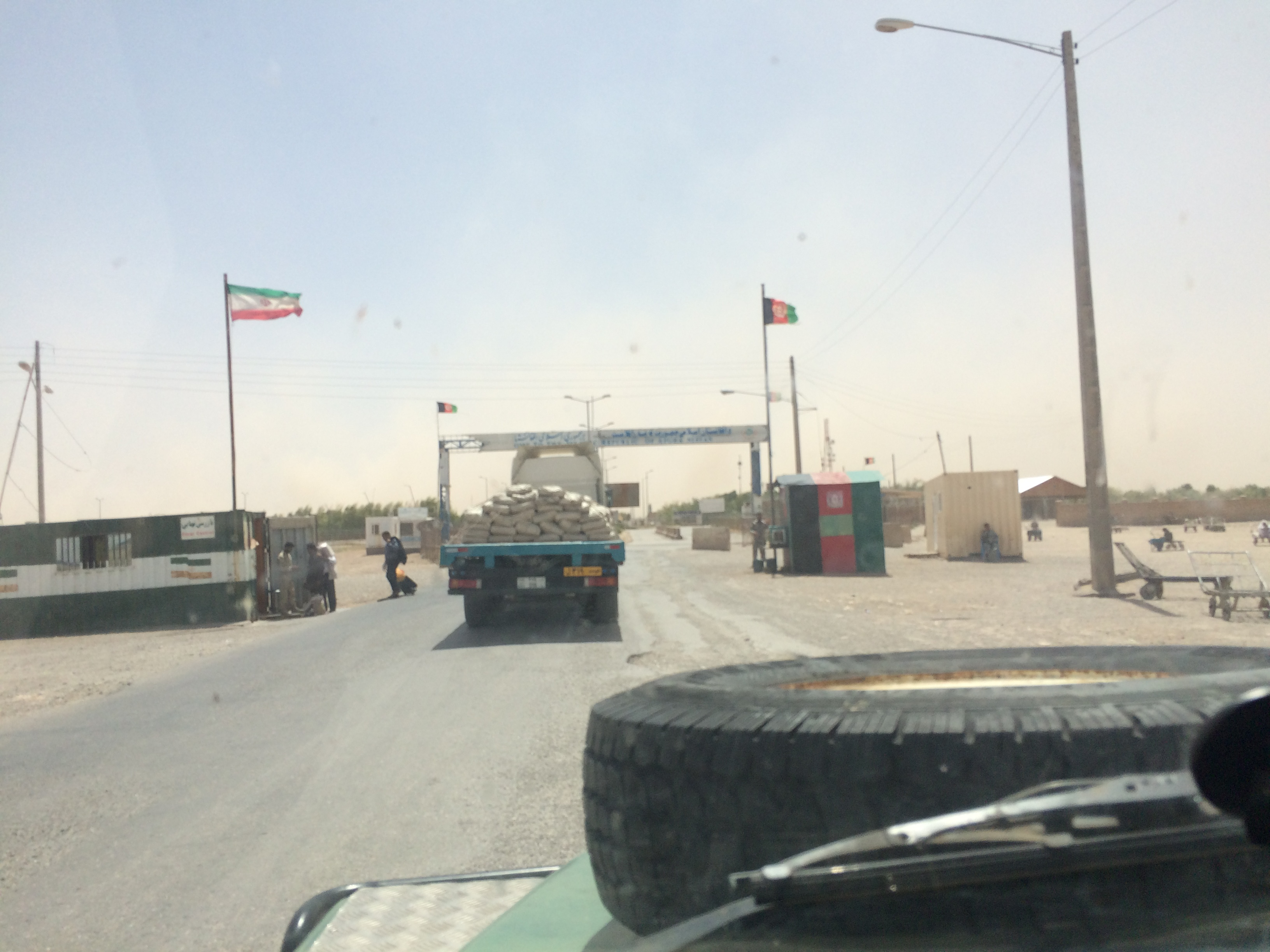
Afghanistan–Iran border

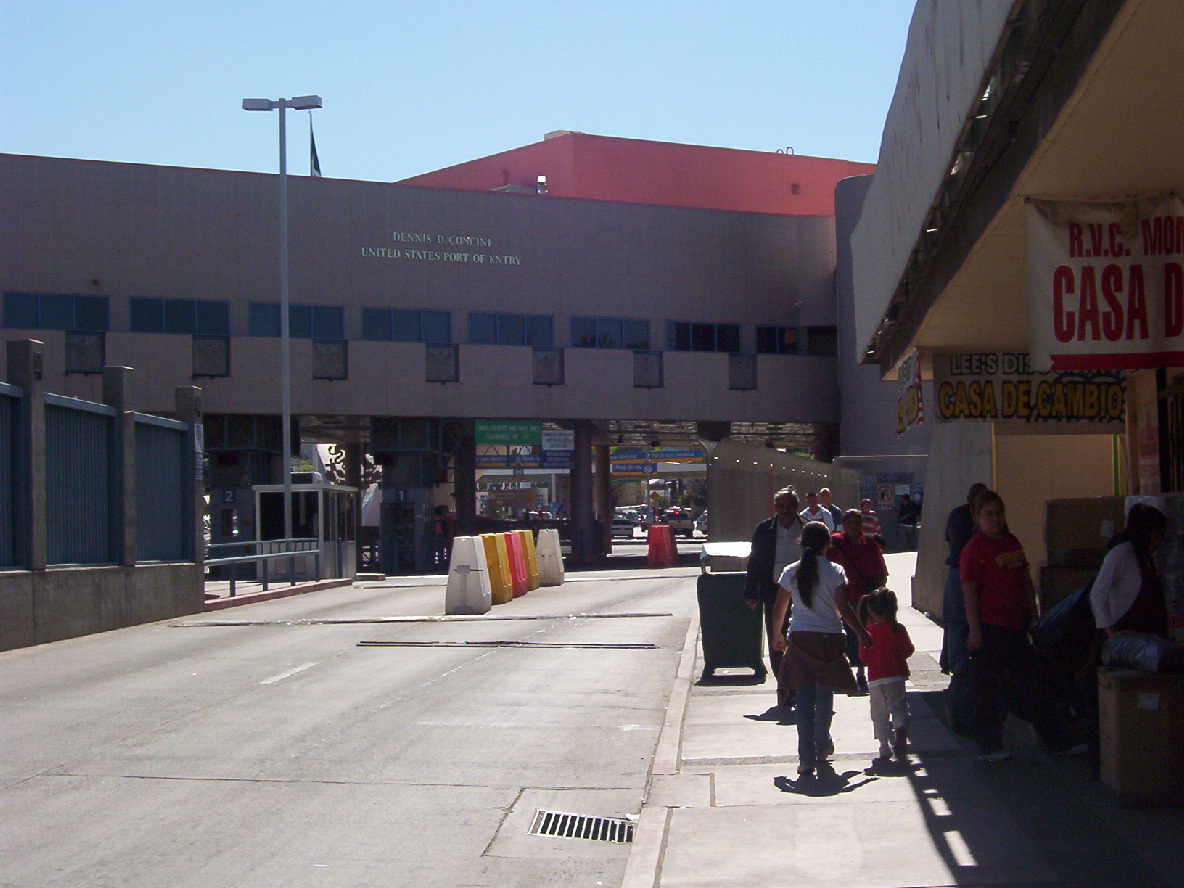
United States–Mexico border checkpoint at Nogales, Arizona.

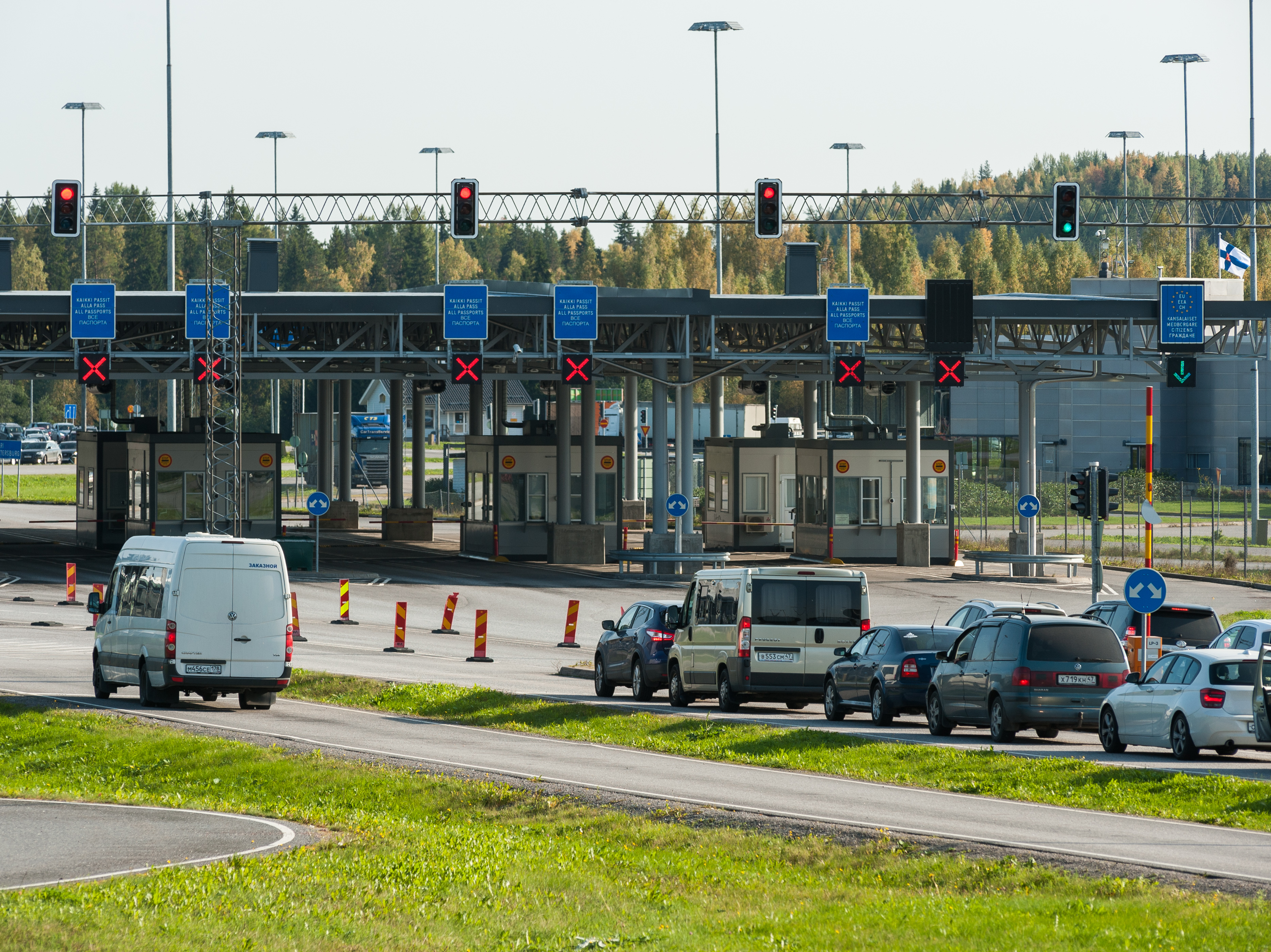
The car traffic on the Finnish side of the Russian border at the Nuijamaa Border Crossing Point in Nuijamaa, Lappeenranta, Finland.

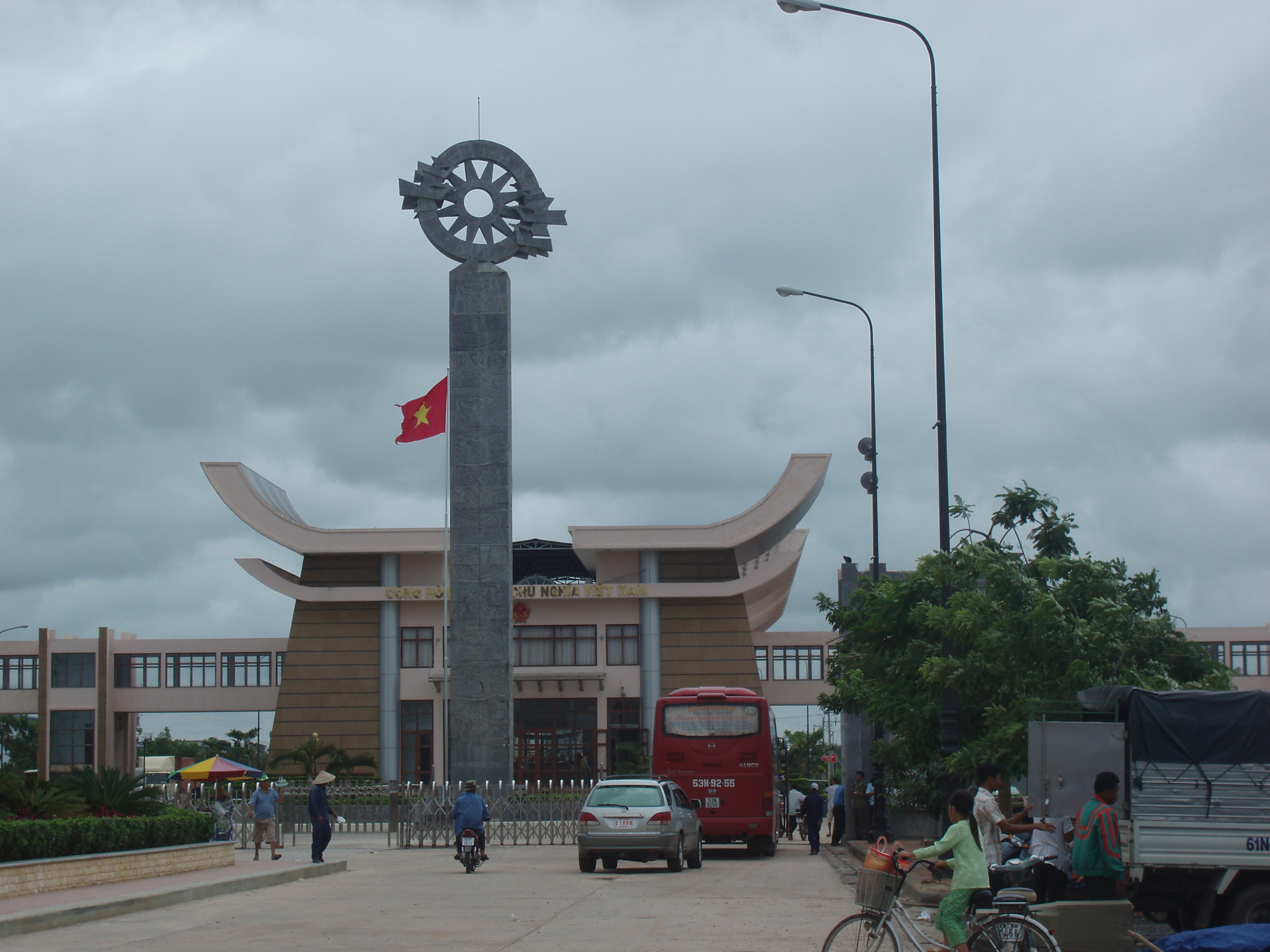
The Vietnam–Cambodia border west of Tây Ninh Province, from the Vietnamese side.

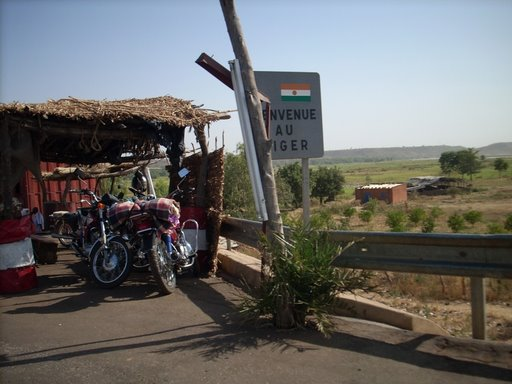
An African road border entering Niger from Benin at Gaya

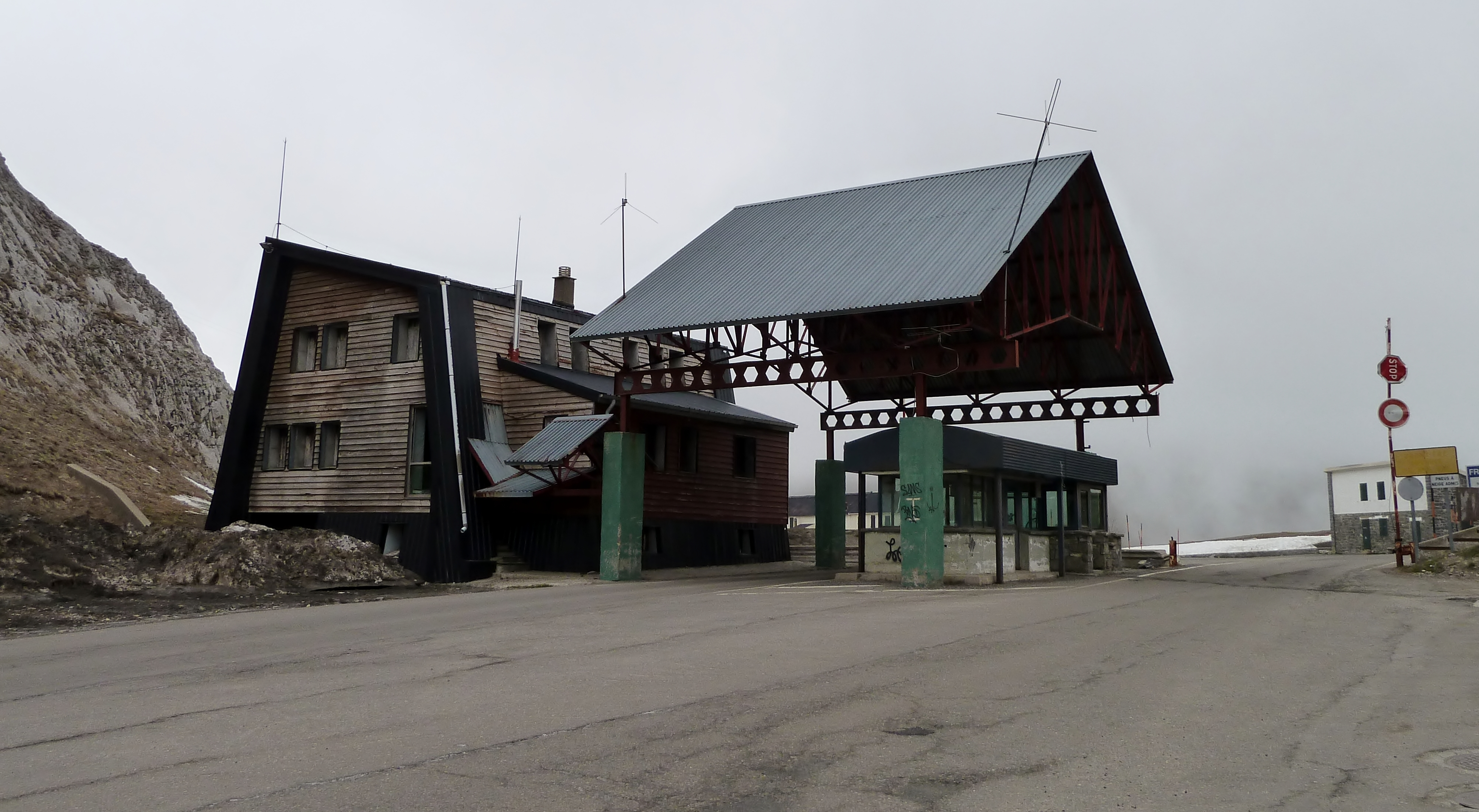
Old border post on the France–Spain border (both countries now part of the Schengen Area)

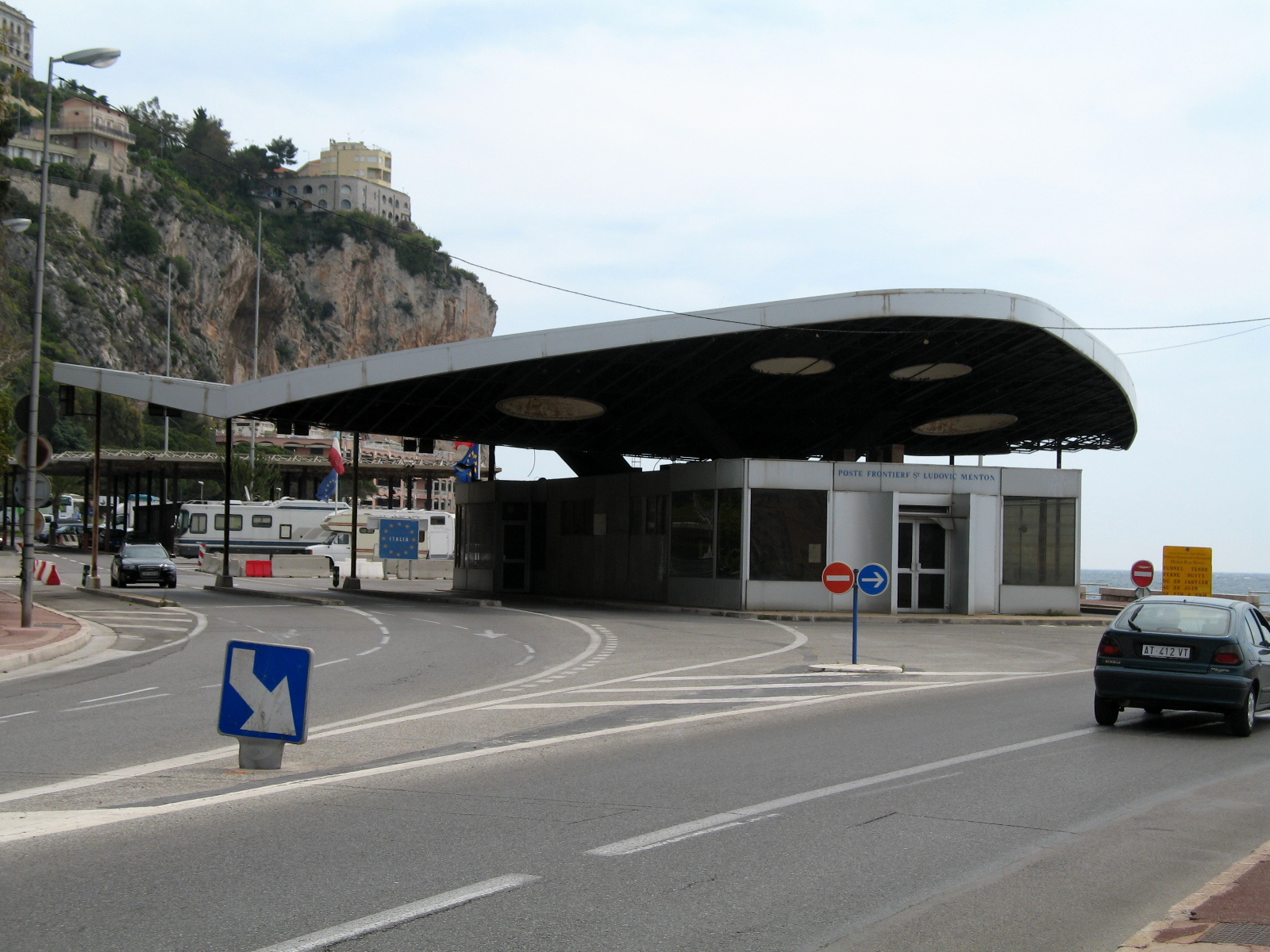
The Pont Saint-Ludovic / Ponte San Ludovico border checkpoint between Menton, France, and Ventimiglia, Italy (both countries are part of the Schengen Area)

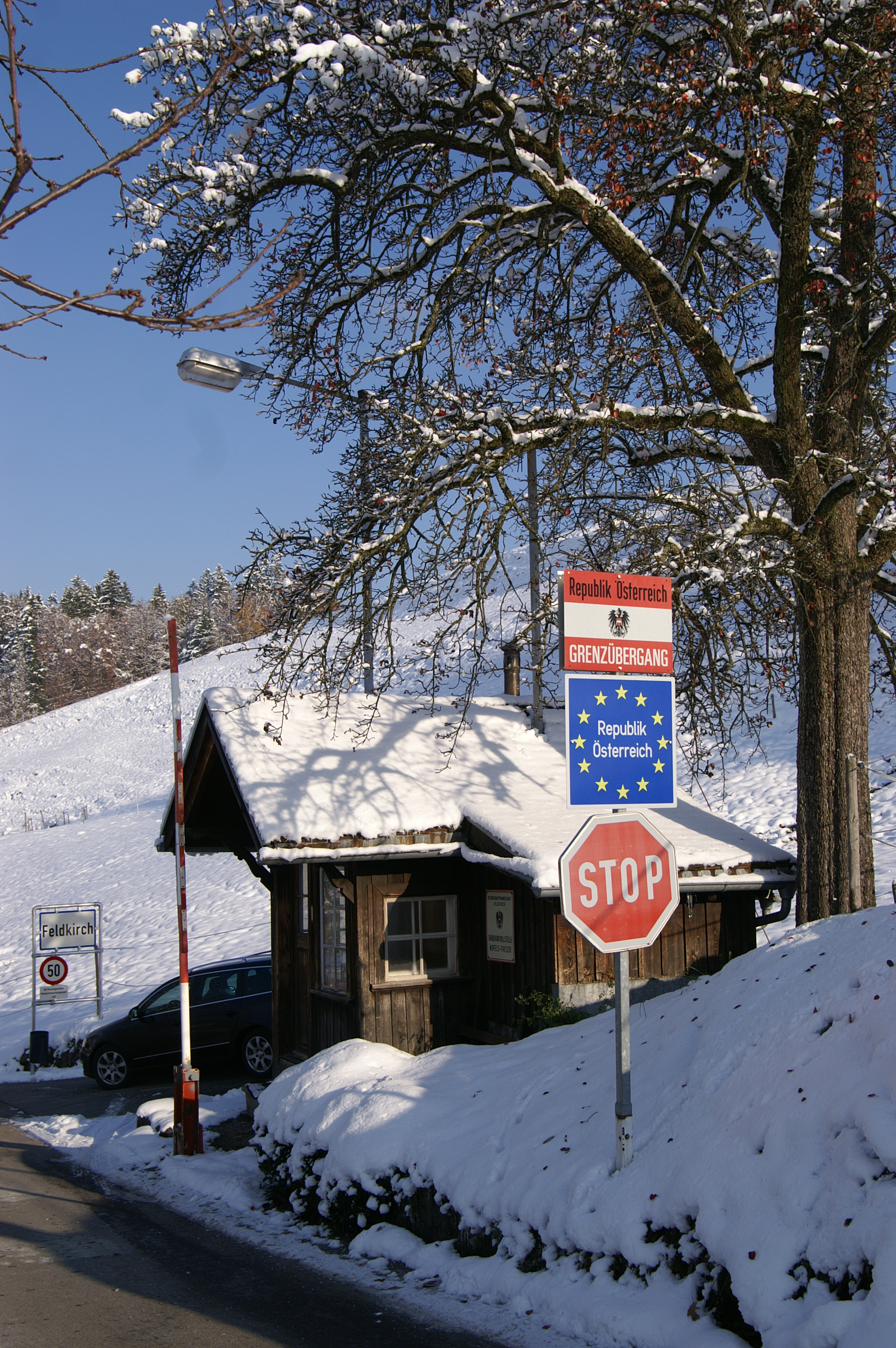
Looking into Austria from Liechtenstein, with a joint border station. Since Liechtenstein joined the Schengen Area in 2011, this border station is for customs formalities only.

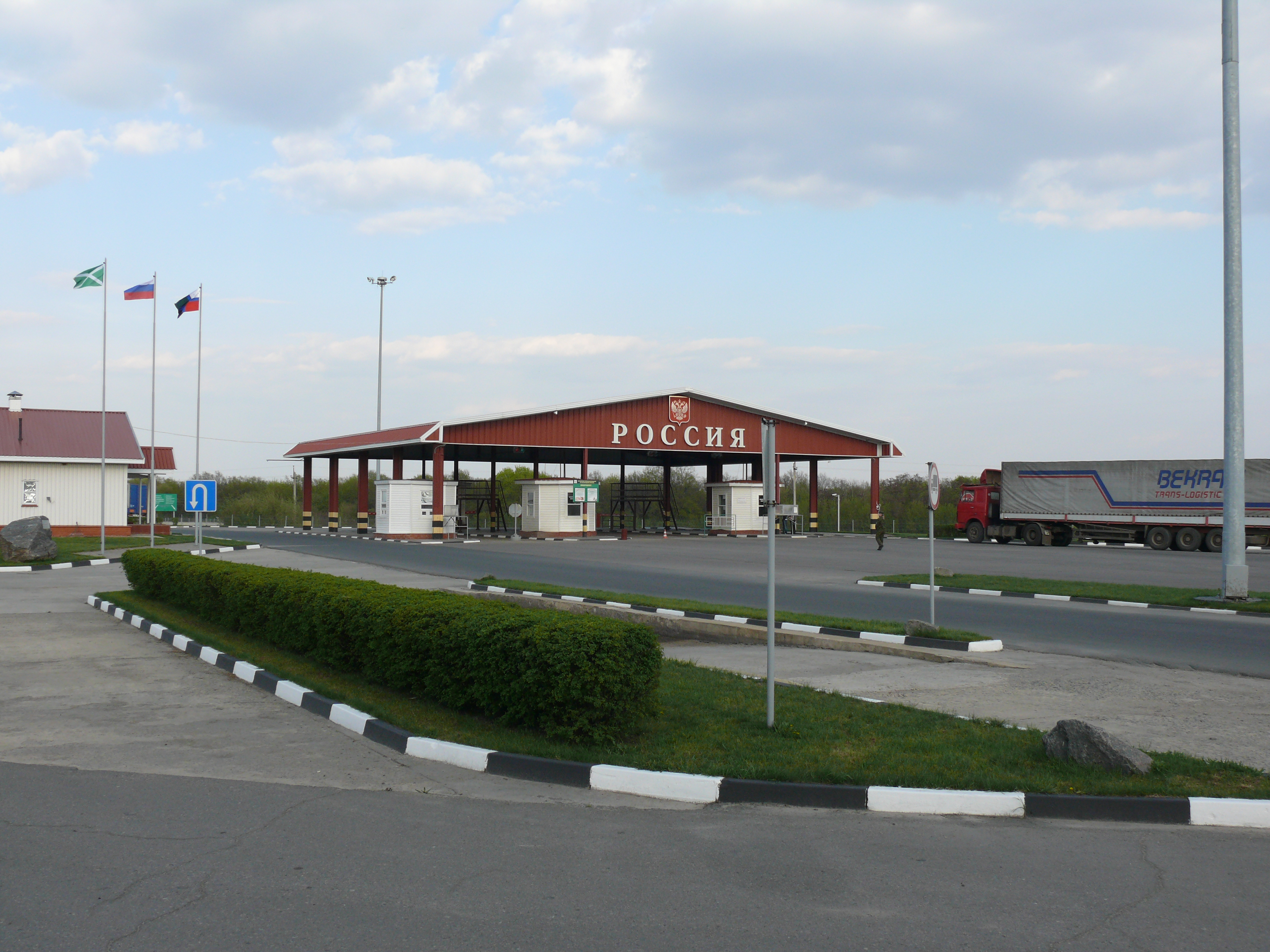
Nekhoteevka customs on the Russia–Ukraine border.

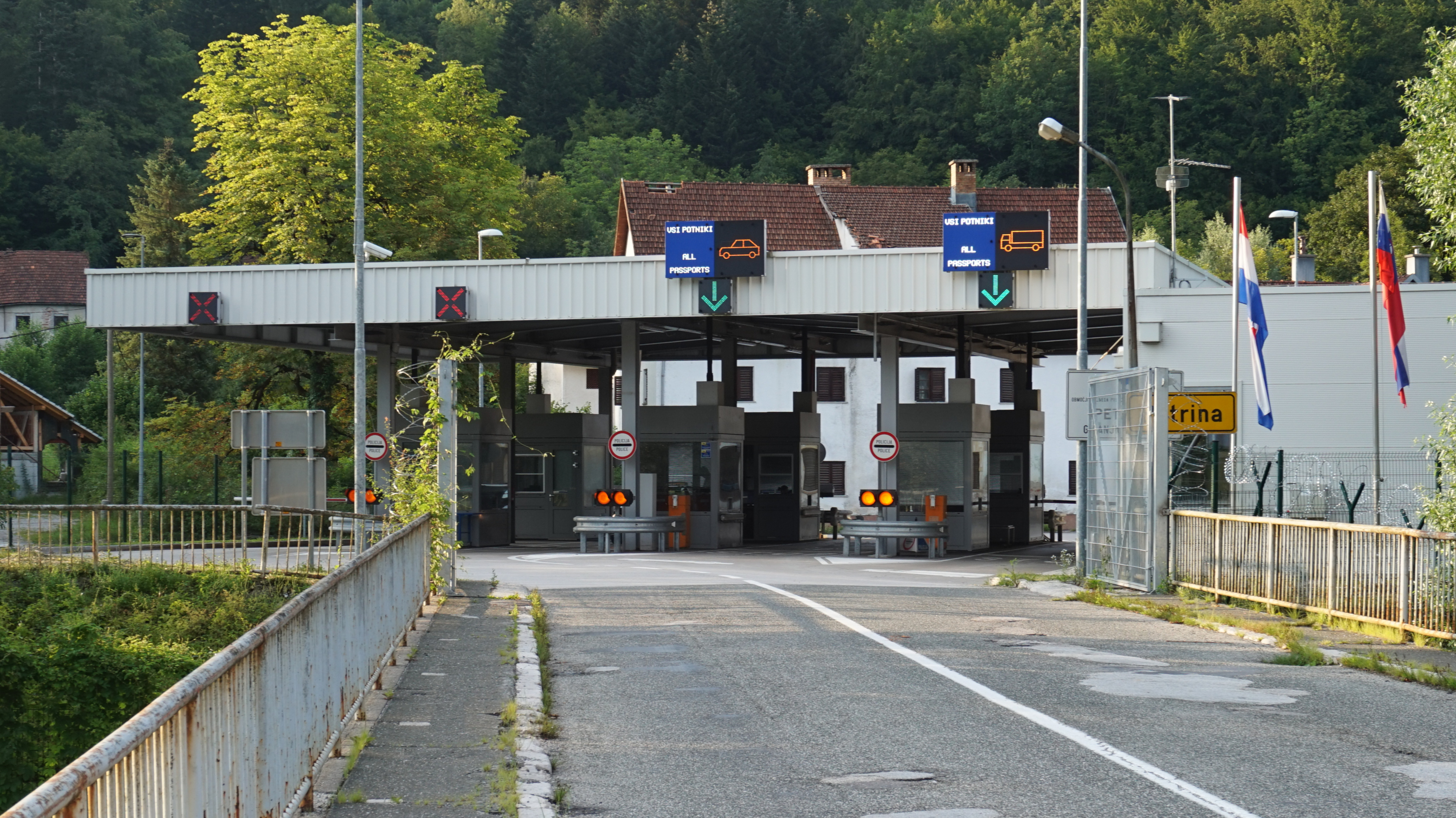
Border checkpoint on the Slovenia–Croatia border (both countries now part of the Schengen Area).

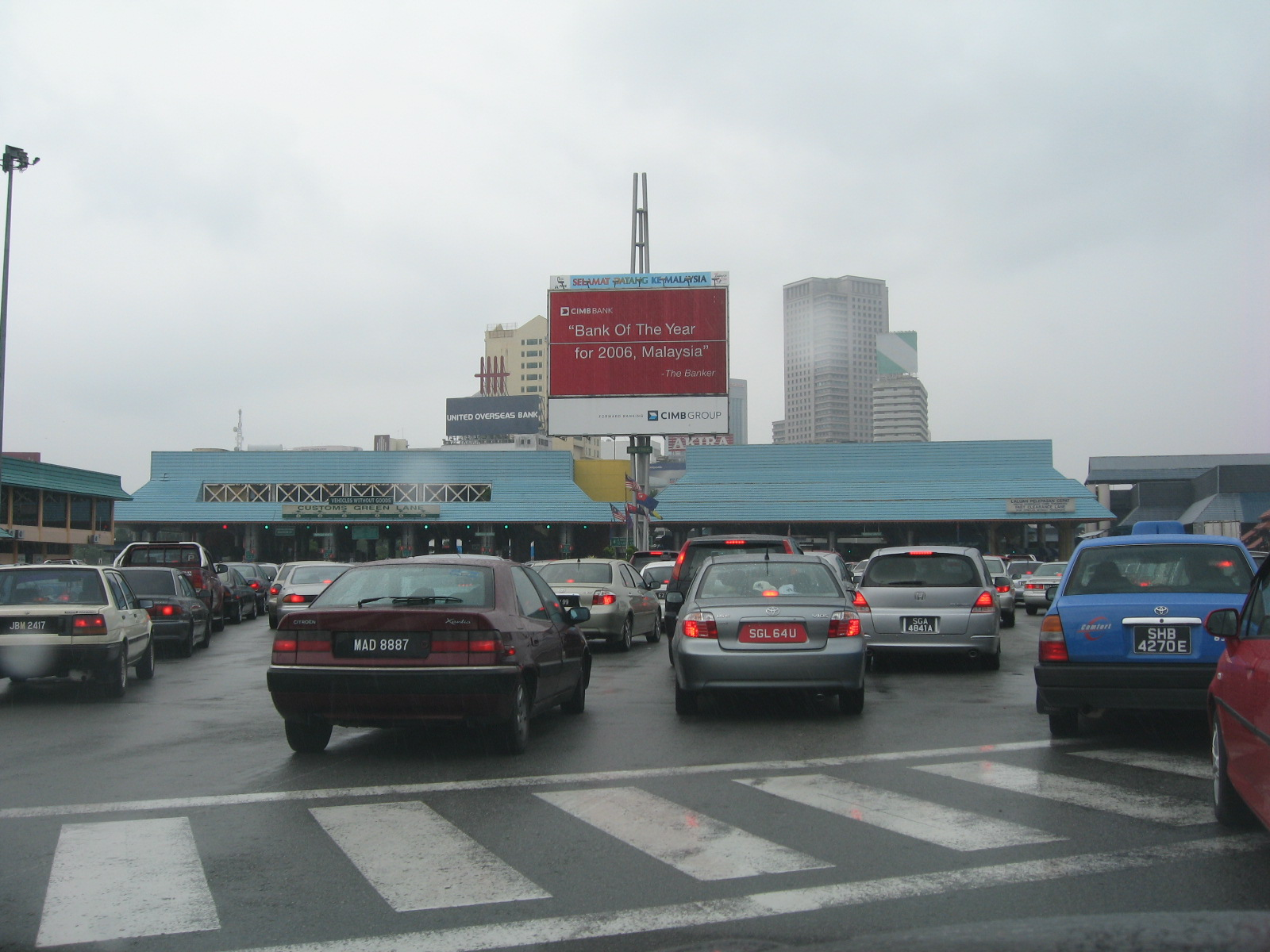
The former checkpoint in Johor Bahru, Malaysia at the Johor–Singapore Causeway. It was replaced by the much larger Sultan Iskandar Building 1 km further inland in 2008.

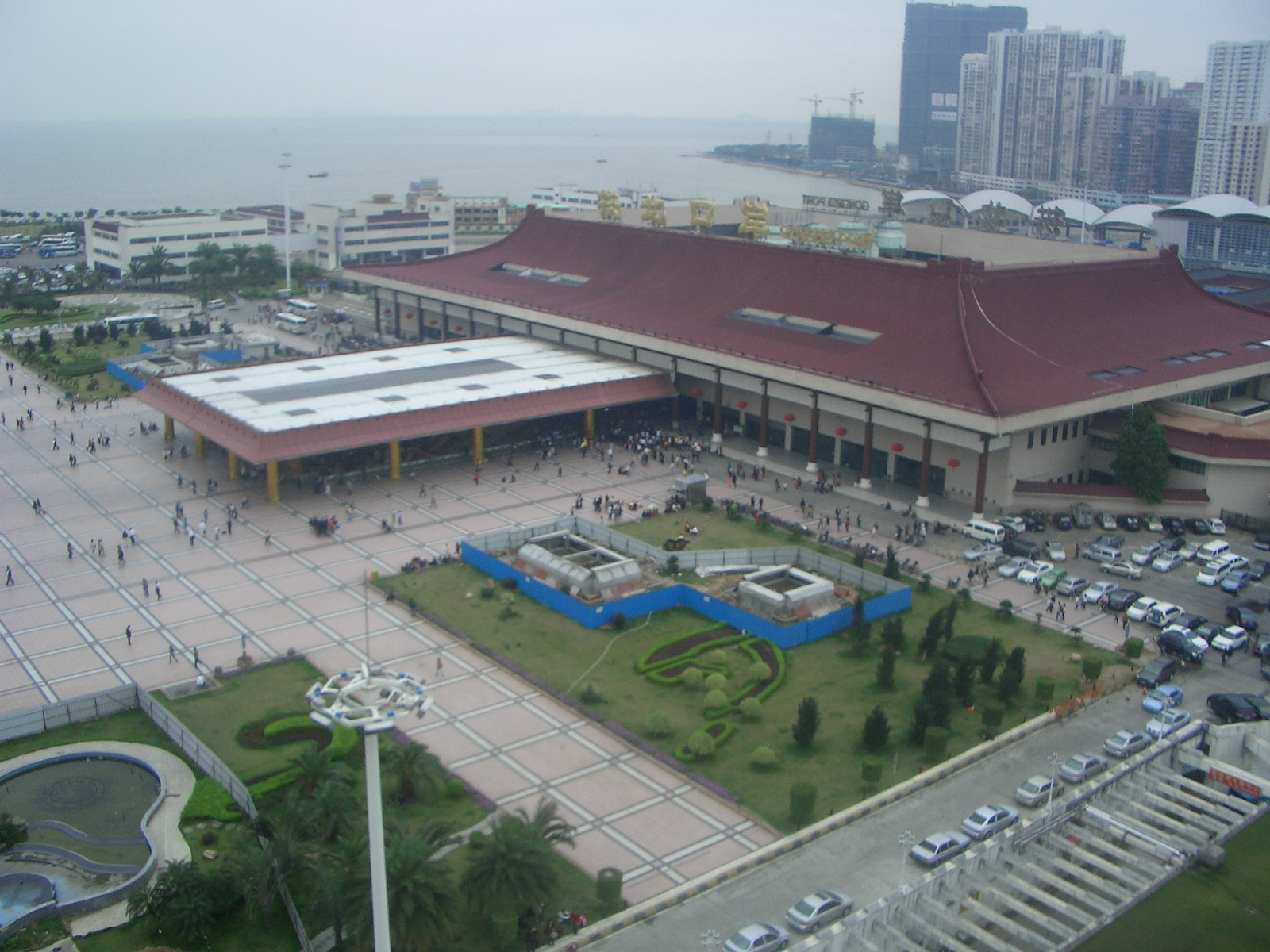
Gongbei Port on the mainland side of the Zhuhai–Macau border.

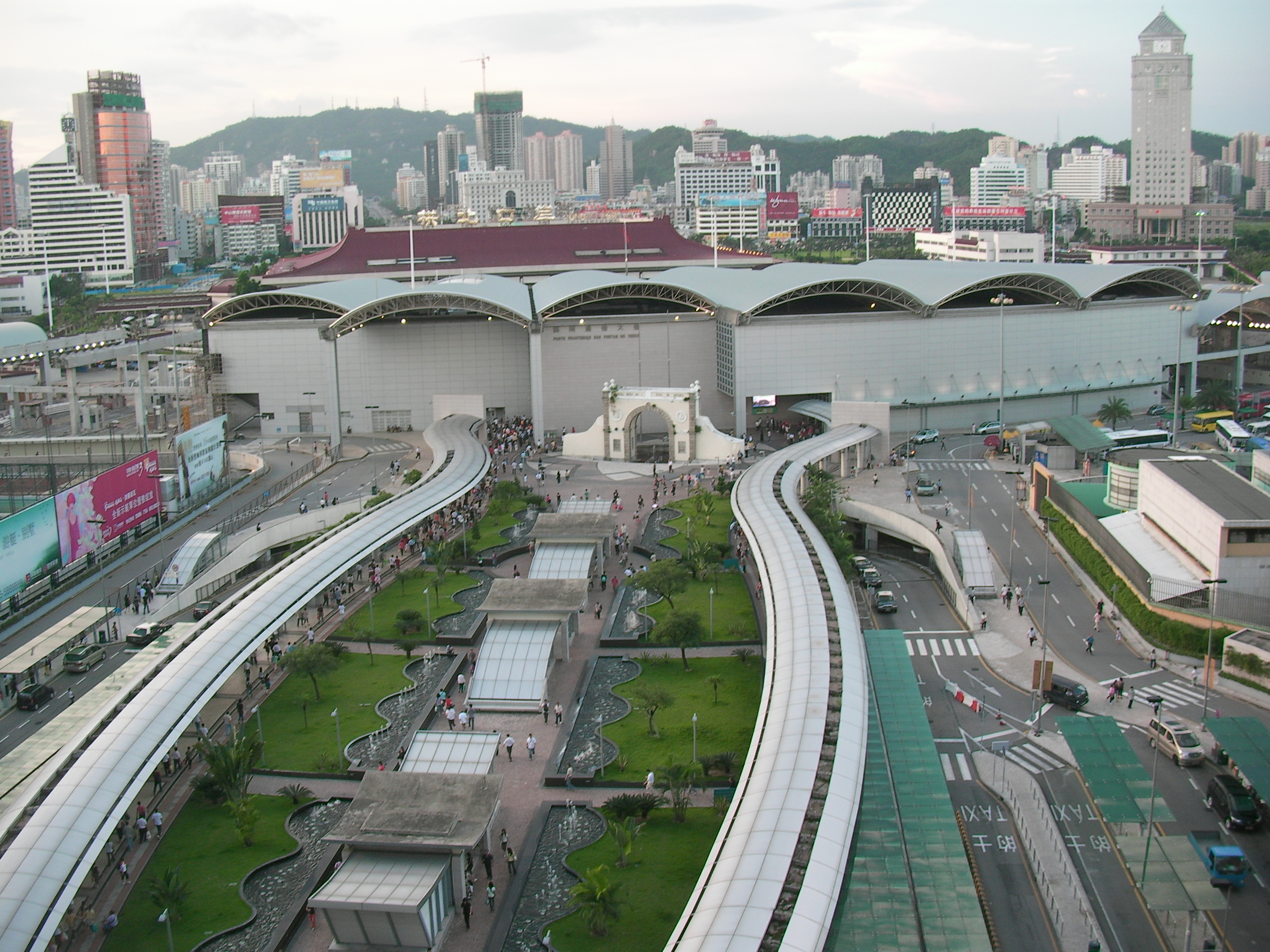
Posto Fronteiriço das Portas do Cerco on the Macanese side of the Zhuhai–Macau border.

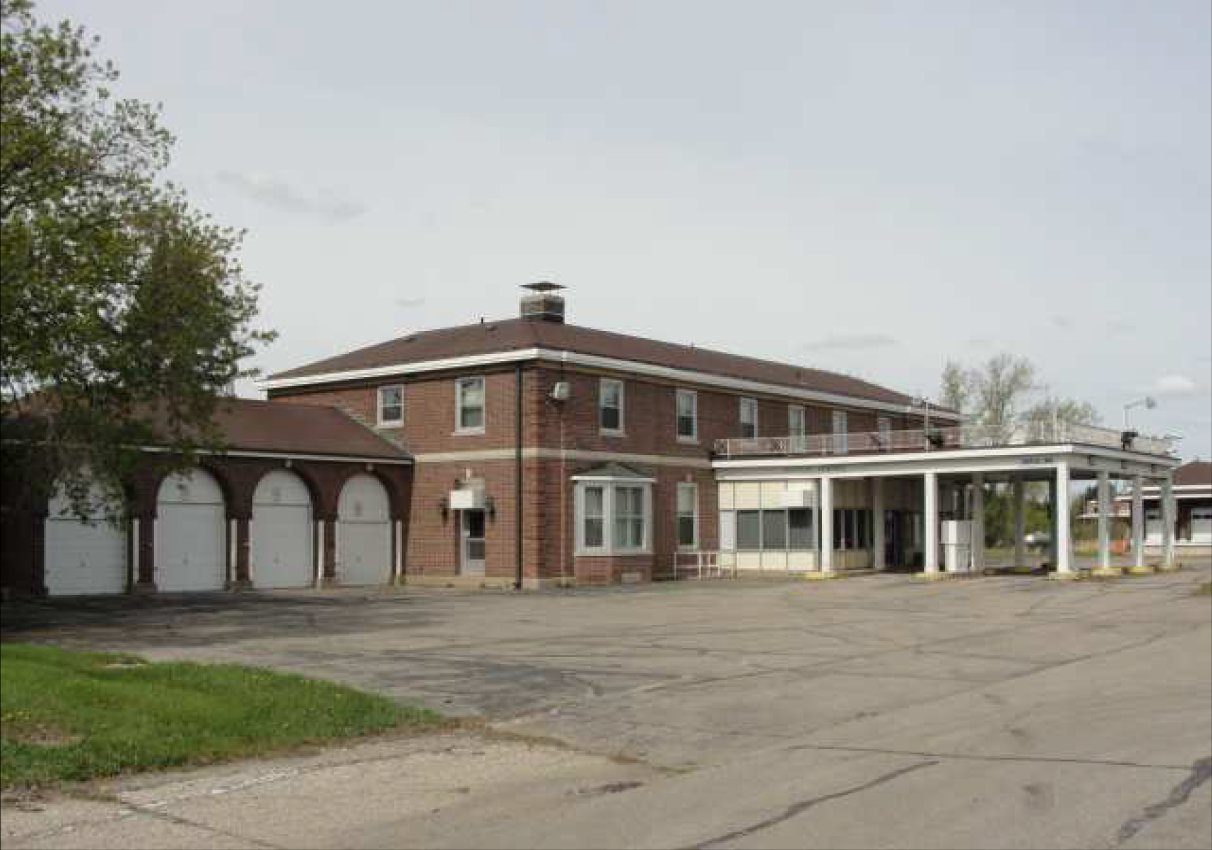
The former customs and immigration station along the Canada–United States border at Noyes, Minnesota, built in 1931, one of the earliest purpose-built border stations in the United States and listed on the National Register of Historic Places.

== See also ==
- Alcabala
- Border
- Border control
- Border outpost
- Checkpoint Charlie and the Berlin Wall
- Customs
- Frontier Closed Area is the border area in Hong Kong with China
- Garita (checkpoint), in Mexico
- Israeli checkpoint
- Schengen Agreement
- The United States–Mexico border and Canada–United States border
- United States Border Patrol interior checkpoints
- List of Canada–United States border crossings
- List of Mexico–United States border crossings
