= U.S. Route 59 =

US highway that runs from Canada to Mexico

U.S. Route 59
- US 59 highlighted in red

Route information
- Length: 1,911 mi (3,075 km)
- Existed: 1934–present

Major junctions
- South end: Fed. 85D at the Mexican border at Laredo, TX
- I-35 / US 83 at Laredo, TX; I-69 from Rosenberg to near Cleveland, TX; I-10 at Houston, TX; I-20 near Marshall, TX; I-30 at Texarkana, TX; I-40 at Sallisaw, OK; I-35 / US 50 at Ottawa, KS; I-70 at Lawrence, KS; I-80 near Avoca, IA; I-90 at Worthington, MN
- North end: PTH 59 at the Canadian border near Lancaster, MN

Location
- Country: United States
- States: Texas, Arkansas, Oklahoma, Kansas, Missouri, Iowa, Minnesota

Highway system
- United States Numbered Highway System; List; Special; Divided
← US 58	→ US 60

U.S. Route 59 (US 59) is a north–south U.S. highway (though it was signed east–west in parts of Texas). A latecomer to the U.S. Highway System, US 59 is now a border-to-border route, part of the NAFTA Corridor Highway System. It parallels US 75 for nearly its entire route, never much more than 100 miles (160 km) away, until it veers southwest in Houston, Texas. Its number is out of place since US 59 is either concurrent with or entirely west of US 71. US 59 also goes into St Joseph seeing I-229 and I-29. The highway's northern terminus is nine miles (14 km) north of Lancaster, Minnesota, at the Lancaster–Tolstoi Border Crossing on the Canadian border, where it continues as Manitoba Highway 59. Its southern terminus is at the Mexican border in Laredo, Texas, where it continues as Mexican Federal Highway 85D.

== Route description ==
=== Texas ===
US 59 in the state of Texas is named the Lloyd Bentsen Highway, after Lloyd Bentsen, former U.S. senator from Texas. In northern Houston, US 59, co-signed with I-69, is the Eastex Freeway (from Downtown Houston to the Liberty–Montgomery county line). To the south, which is also co-signed with I-69, it is the Southwest Freeway (from Rosenberg to Downtown Houston), which is one of the busiest sections of freeway in the United States with a vehicle count, as of 2006, over 330,000 vehicles per day just outside the Loop.

US 59 (overlapped by US 71) actually straddles the border between Texas and Arkansas north of I-30 near Texarkana, with the east side of the highway on the Arkansas side and the west side of the highway on the Texas side. In the past, both highways remained on the border past I-30 as State Line Avenue to Downtown Texarkana; today, only US 71 does so. Nearly 90% of this route is designated to become part of I-69 in the future. Currently, 75 mph (120 km/h) speed limits are allowed on US 59 in Duval County and portions of northern Polk County.

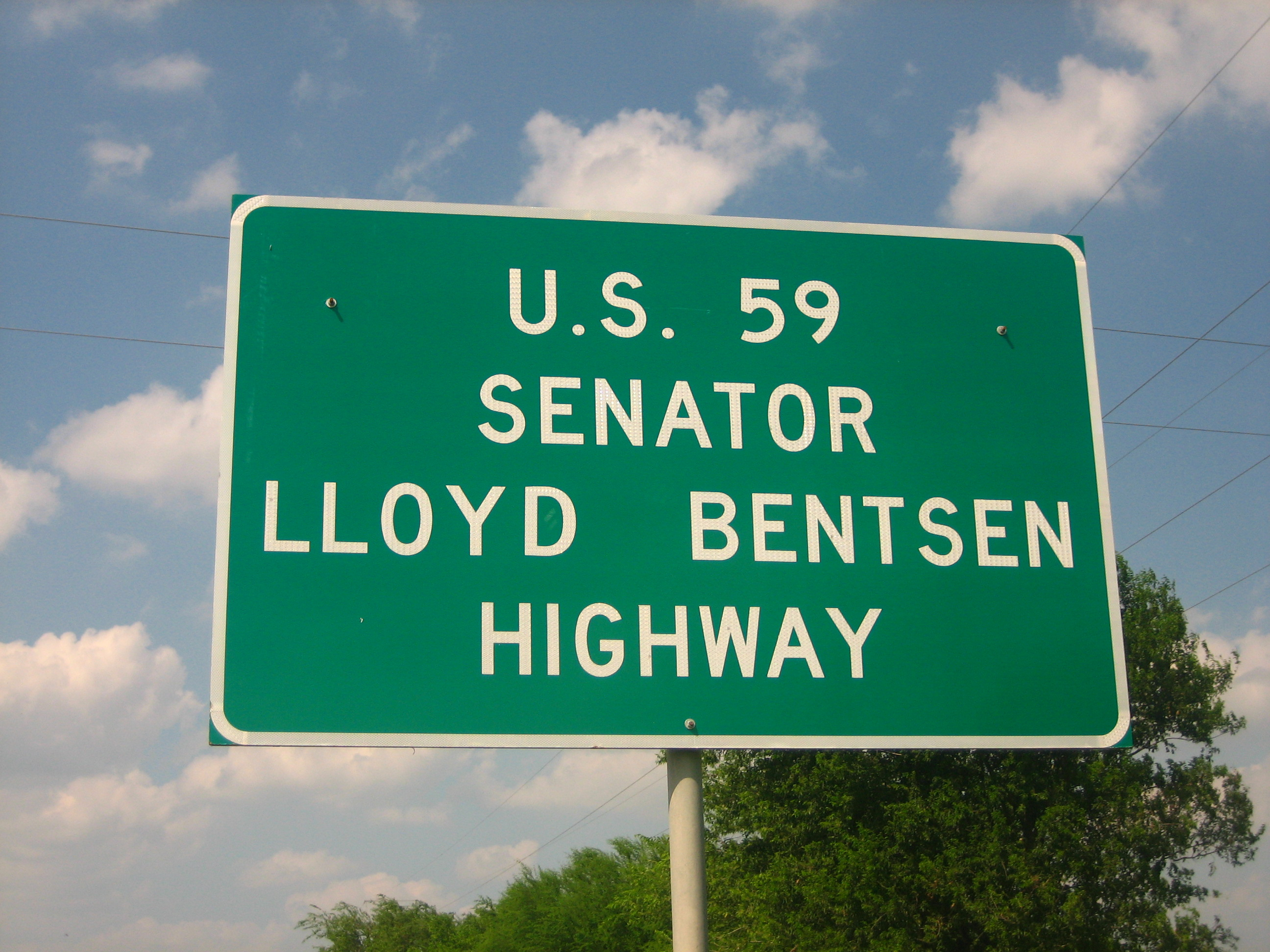
In Texas, U.S. Route 59 is known as the Lloyd Bentsen Highway for the U.S. senator (1971-1993) and the Democratic vice-presidential nominee (1988).

From the southwestern suburbs of Houston to Downtown Houston, US 59 is commonly referred to as the "Southwest Freeway", sometimes derisively as the "Southwest's Best Freeway." Supporting 371,000 vehicles per day, it is one of the busiest freeways in the United States. US 59 is known as the "Eastex Freeway" in the north/northeast part of the Houston region. At the Mexican border, it ends at the World Trade International Bridge in Laredo, Texas. In Laredo, US 59 is co-signed with both I-69W and Loop 20, and has an intersection of I-35 which ends at the Juarez-Lincoln International Bridge. After crossing the bridge into Mexico, I-35 continues as Mexican Federal Highway 85 in Nuevo Laredo, which then runs through Mexico and Central America and ends in Panama at the Panama Canal.

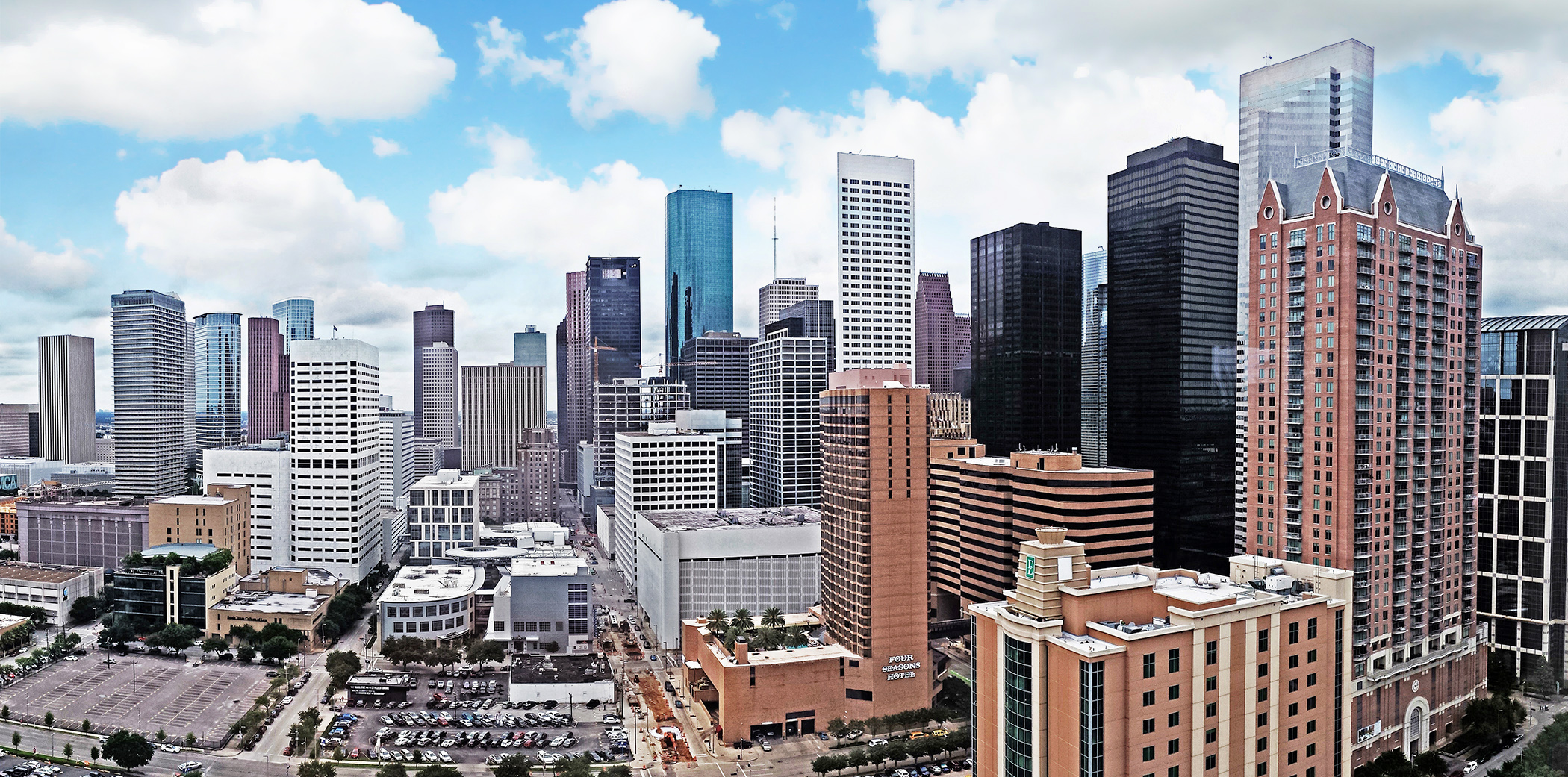
Downtown Houston skyline along US 59

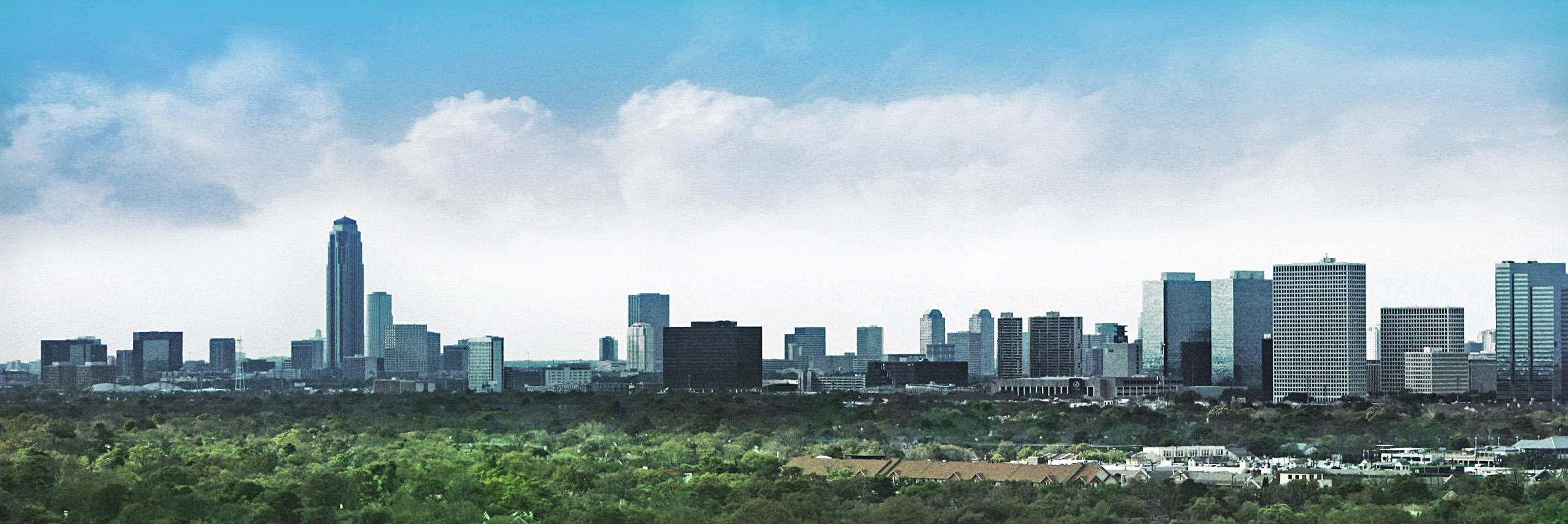
Uptown Houston skyscrapers along US 59

=== Arkansas ===
In Arkansas, US 59 is concurrent with US 71 from I-30 at Texarkana to Acorn, and with US 270 from Acorn to the Oklahoma state line. The Third Loop was to be extended on I-49 from its original northern end to US 71 at the Texas state line opened on May 15, 2013, and was extended to State Line Road, where it intersects with US 59 and US 71 in Texas.

=== Oklahoma ===
US 59 and US 412 are co-signed for 10 miles (16 km) in Delaware County, Oklahoma.

US 59 is co-signed with US 270 from the Arkansas state line to Heavener and US 271 from Poteau to west of Spiro. It is also co-signed with US 64 in Sallisaw.

=== Kansas ===
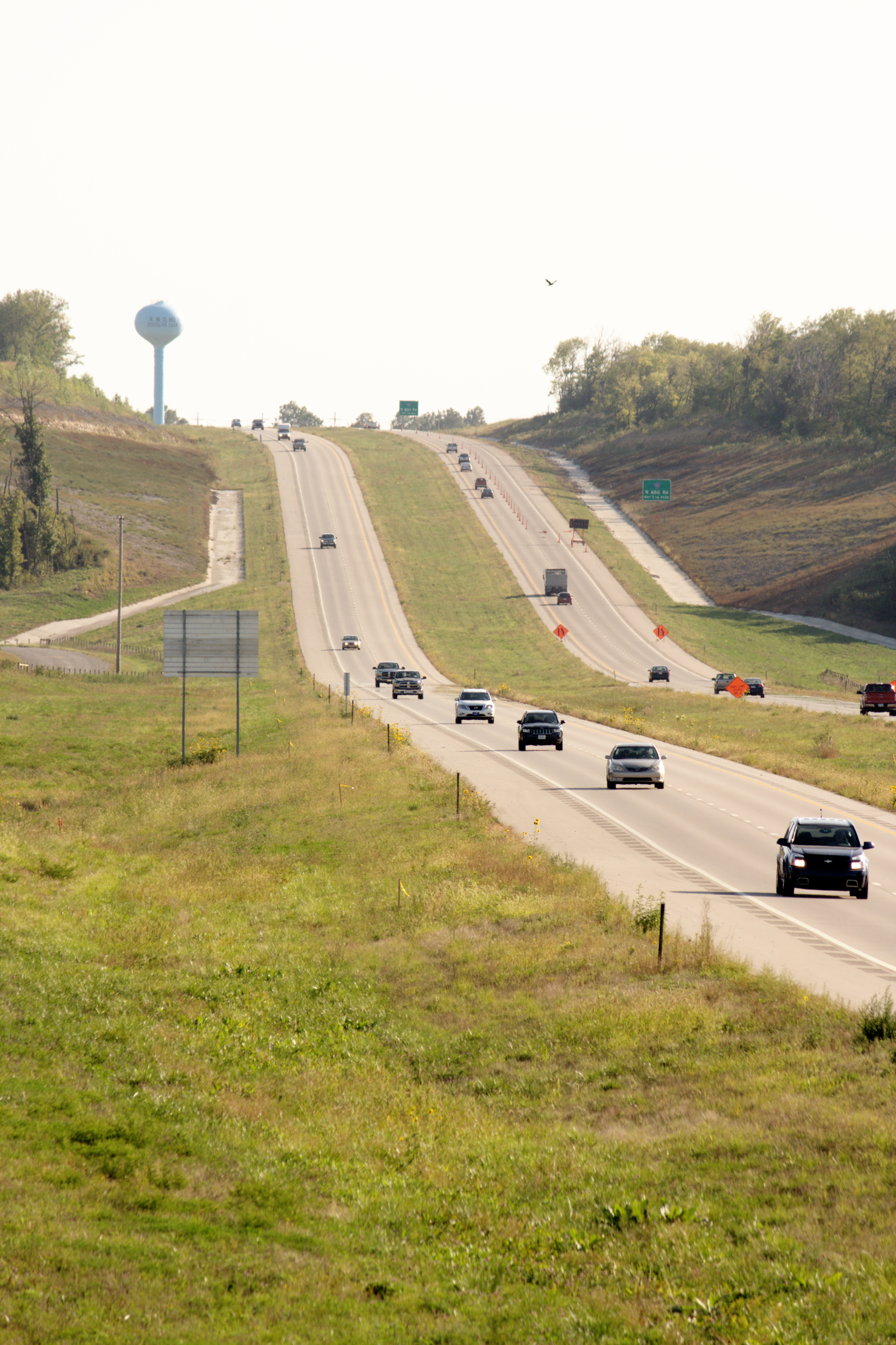
US 59 freeway between Ottawa, Kansas, and Lawrence, Kansas

US 59 enters the state just south of Chetopa and runs nearly directly north across the state. It runs concurrently with US 169 starting about five miles (8.0 km) south of Garnett and diverges north again immediately south of Garnett. The intersection immediately south of Garnett used to be a braided intersection with stop and yield signs. It was identified as a high-crash location in 2001, and was rebuilt as a roundabout that opened in April 2006. The Kansas Department of Transportation is rebuilding or planning to rebuild several other rural intersections as roundabouts for increased safety. Until 2012, US 59 passed through Ottawa, Kansas, and had to be shut down or detoured every time the Marais Des Cygnes floodwall gates were closed across the highway. The highway now bypasses around Ottawa, running concurrently with I-35 for five miles (8.0 km) and using that highway's bridges over the Marais Des Cygnes. US 59 passes through Lawrence. The street name of US 59 in Lawrence is Iowa Street, then 6th Street as it joins US 40 and jogs east to cross the Kansas River near downtown. North of the U.S. 40 and 59 Bridges, it splits with US 40 as it joins US 24 briefly and jogs back west before resuming a northerly course. It continues north to Nortonville, then northeast to Atchison, where it crosses the Missouri River over the Amelia Earhart Bridge.

US 59 has been rebuilt and rerouted just to the east between Lawrence and Ottawa as a divided highway, as the former road was one of the most dangerous stretches of highway in the state. The project began in mid-2007, and was completed and opened to the public on October 17, 2012.

=== Missouri ===
In Missouri, US 59 travels northerly through the northwest corner of the state, largely amidst the Missouri River Valley and Loess Hills. The highway crosses the Missouri River east of Atchison, Kansas at Winthrop and travels northeast towards St. Joseph. In St. Joseph, the highway is paired with I-229 through downtown, and then departs from I-229 as Saint Joseph Avenue. It later joins with Bus. US 71 at its first junction with I-29 in Andrew County. US 59 and Bus. US 71 continue up to and through Savannah before reaching US 71, where the business route terminates, and US 59 continues west. US 59 then tracks with I-29 closely through Holt County, crossing it four separate times, until diverging northward at Craig. There it begins a very northerly route that it follows through the rest of the state. It passes through Fairfax and Tarkio before exiting the state 10 miles (16 km) north of Tarkio. This last section of US 59 is immortalized in the Brewer and Shipley song "Tarkio Road".

=== Iowa ===
In Iowa, US 59 is a main north–south artery in the western part of the state. It enters Iowa south of Shenandoah and joins I-80 at Avoca. It passes through the county seats of Harlan, Denison, Cherokee, and Primghar. Except for small stretches of expressway near Avoca, Denison, and Holstein, the entire length of US 59 in Iowa is an undivided two-lane road. US 59 exits the state near Hawkeye Point, the highest point in the state of Iowa.

=== Minnesota ===
US 59 enters Minnesota south of Worthington, just one mile (1.6 km) east of Bigelow. It passes through rural western Minnesota for its entire length in the state. Some cities along the way include Slayton, Marshall, Clarkfield, Montevideo, and Morris. US 59 overlaps I-94/US 52 in the Fergus Falls area. North of Fergus Falls, US 59 passes through Pelican Rapids, Detroit Lakes, and Thief River Falls before ending at the Lancaster–Tolstoi border crossing on the Canadian border. US 59 runs for about 425 miles (684 km) through Minnesota.

The Minnesota section of US 59 is legally defined as all or part of Routes 265, 16, 17, 88, 66, 144, 3, 30, and 174 in Minnesota Statutes §§ 161.115(19), (75), and (196) and 161.114(2).

== History ==
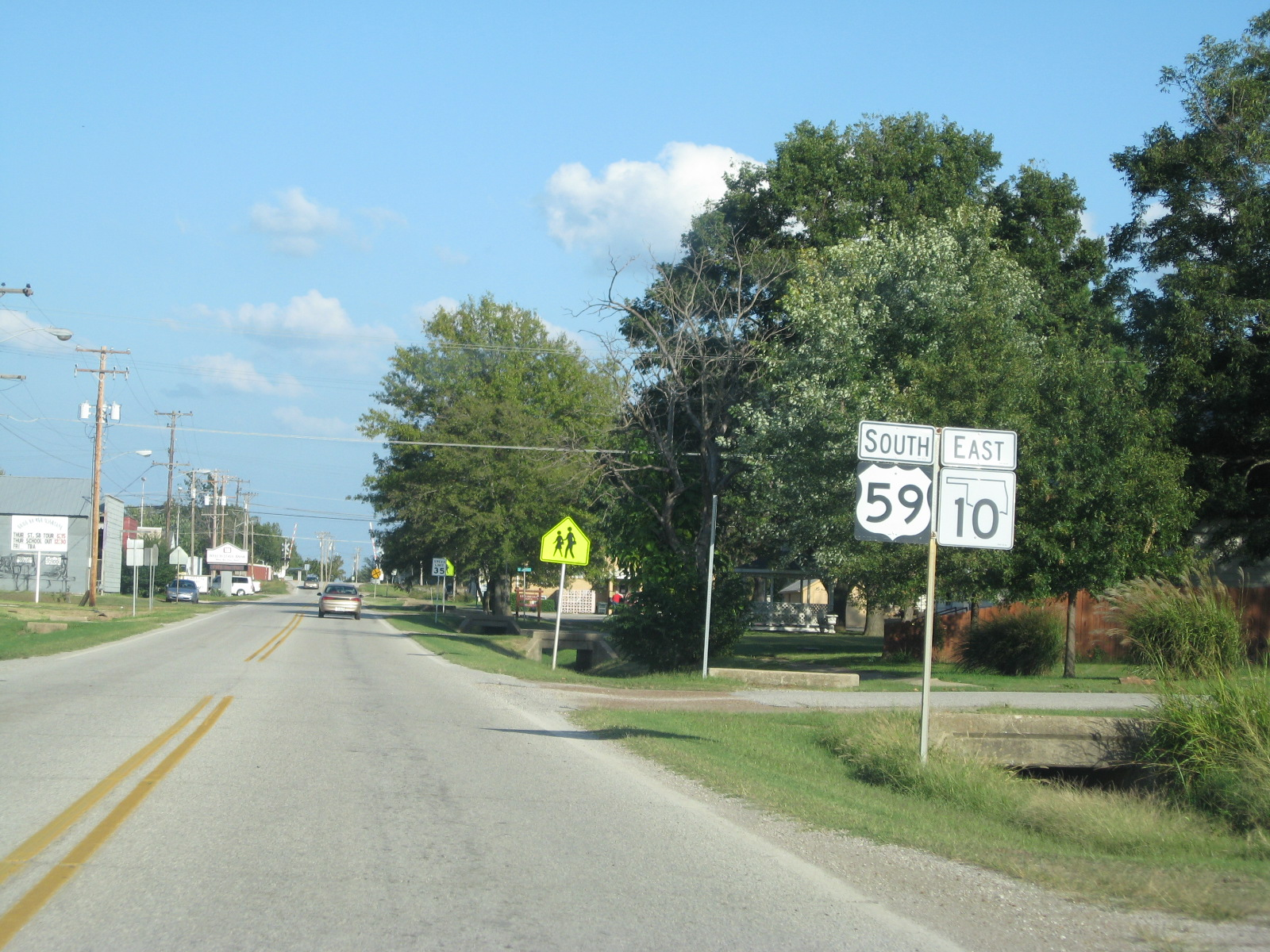
US 59 and State Highway 10 in Welch, Oklahoma

In 1934, a coalition of government officials from Missouri, Iowa, and Minnesota agreed to sign the current US 59 as Highway 73 in an attempt to extend US 73 north from Atchison, Kansas. However, the American Association of State Highway Officials (AASHO) approved the route as US 59, instead.

The part in Missouri was defined in 1922 as Route 52 from Kansas to St. Joseph, Route 1 from St. Joseph to Tarkio, and Route 61 from Tarkio to Iowa. Route 61 became Route 9 in 1926, and Route 52 became part of Route 4 in 1927, and this portion became Route 18 in 1932, before being removed in favor of US 59 in the 1930s.

=== Historic termini ===
Before the 1950s, US 59 headed northwest to US 75 at Noyes, crossed the Red River of the North at St. Vincent, and terminated at US 81 in Pembina, North Dakota. A new highway and border crossing were built north of Lancaster on the present alignment in 1950. The former segment of US 59 between Lancaster and US 75 became CR 6, and the extremely short segment between US 75 and US 81 became MN 171 and ND 59. ND 59 still exists in Pembina from the state line to I-29.

From 1934 to 1935, the US 59 designation referred to a 50-mile-long (80 km) route across southeastern Minnesota, from Lake City, Minnesota, to the Iowa state line just short of Chester, Iowa. That entire route is now part of US 63, and nowhere close to the present US 59, established in 1935.

In 1933, much of the present US 59 and the entirety of US 96 in Texas were originally proposed to be part of US 71. Under this plan, discussed at a meeting of the United States Good Roads Association in Beaumont, US 71 was to be diverted out of Louisiana altogether and instead rerouted from the Texarkana area southward through East Texas.

== Future ==
A large portion of US 59 is proposed to become part of the future extension of I-69, I-69W and I-369 through Texas, allowing the current alignment and right-of-way to be upgraded without the need for government environmental studies or extensive eminent domain proceedings.

== Major intersections ==
Texas
World Trade International Bridge at the Mexican border
I-69W in Laredo. The highways travel concurrently through the city.
I-35 / US 83 in Laredo
Future I-69C / US 281 in George West
I-37 east of George West
US 181 in Beeville
US 183 in Goliad
Future I-69 / Future I-69E / Future I-69W / US 77 southwest of Victoria. I-69/US 59 will travel concurrently to Houston. US 59/US 77 travels concurrently to south-southwest of Victoria.
US 87 in Victoria
I-69 / I-610 in Houston
I-45 in Houston
I-10 / US 90 in Houston
I-69 / I-610 in Houston. I-69/US 59 will travel concurrently to Tenaha.
US 190 in Livingston
US 287 in Corrigan
US 69 in Lufkin. The highways travel concurrently through the city.
US 259 in Redfield
US 84 in Timpson. The highways travel concurrently to Tenaha.
Future I-69 / Future I-369 / US 84 / US 96 in Tenaha. I-369/US 59 will travel concurrently to Texarkana.
US 79 in Carthage. The highways travel concurrently to north of Carthage.
I-20 in Marshall
US 80 in Marshall
I-369 in Texarkana. I-369/US 59 travels concurrently to I-30.
US 67 in Texarkana
US 82 in Texarkana
I-30 / I-369 in Texarkana. I-30/US 59 travels concurrently to the Arkansas state line.
Arkansas
I-30 / US 71 in Texarkana. US 59/US 71 travels concurrently to Acorn.
Texas
I-49 north of Texarkana
Arkansas
US 371 in Lockesburg. The highways travel concurrently to De Queen.
US 70 in Saline Township. The highways travel concurrently to De Queen.
US 278 in Wickes
US 71 / US 270 in Acorn. US 59/US 270 travels concurrently to Heavener, Oklahoma.
Oklahoma
US 259 west-northwest of Page
US 271 in Poteau. The highways travel concurrently to west of Spiro.
I-40 in Sallisaw
US 64 in Sallisaw. The highways travel concurrently through the city.
US 62 in Westville
US 412 in West Siloam Springs. The highways travel concurrently to Kansas.
US 60 / US 69 east-northeast of Afton. US 59/US 60 travels concurrently for approximately 0.6 miles (0.97 km). US 59/US 69 travels concurrently to north of Dotyville.
I-44 / US 60 east-northeast of Afton
Kansas
US 166 in Chetopa. The highways travel concurrently through the city.
US 160 in Oswego. The highways travel concurrently to the Mount Pleasant–Fairview township line.
US 400 in Parsons
US 54 in Moran
US 169 in Welda Township. The highways travel concurrently to Washington Township.
I-35 / US 50 in Ottawa. The highways travel concurrently to Ottawa Township.
US 56 in Willow Springs Township
US 40 in Lawrence. The highways travel concurrently through the city.
I-70 in Lawrence
US 24 / US 40 in Lawrence. US 24/US 59 travels concurrently to Williamstown.
US 73 in Shannon Township. The highways travel concurrently to Atchison.
Missouri
I-229 in St. Joseph. The highways travel concurrently through the city.
US 36 in St. Joseph
I-29 / US 71 in Jefferson Township
US 71 in Nodaway Township
I-29 in Jackson Township. The highways travel concurrently to Nodaway Township.
I-29 in Hickory Township
US 159 in Hickory Township
I-29 in Union Township
US 136 in Tarkio Township. The highways travel concurrently to Tarkio.
Iowa
US 34 in Indian Creek Township
US 6 in Belknap Township. The highways travel concurrently to Oakland.
I-80 in Avoca
US 30 in Denison. The highways travel concurrently through the city.
US 20 on the Logan–Griggs township line. The highways travel concurrently to Holstein.
US 18 on the Franklin–Lincoln township line. The highways travel concurrently to Sanborn.
Minnesota
I-90 in Worthington
US 14 in Custer Township
US 212 in Camp Release Township. The highways travel concurrently to Montevideo.
US 12 in Moyer Township
I-94 / US 52 on the Buse–Dane Prairie township line. The highways travel concurrently to Fergus Falls Township.
US 10 in Detroit Lakes
US 2 in Knute Township
PTH 59 at the Canadian border on the Richardville–St. Joseph township line

== See also ==
- U.S. Route 159
- U.S. Route 259

Browse numbered routes
← SH 57	TX	→ SH 59
← AR 58	AR	→ AR 59
← SH-58	OK	→ SH-59
← K-58	KS	→ K-60
← Route 58	MO	→ Route 59
← Iowa 58	IA	→ Iowa 60
← MN 58	MN	→ MN 60
