= North Dakota Highway 58 =

State highway in North Dakota, U.S.

North Dakota Highway 58

Route information
- Maintained by NDDOT
- Length: 9.800 mi (15.772 km)
- Existed: c. 1927–present
- Tourist routes: Lewis and Clark Trail

Major junctions
- South end: ND 200 in East Fairview
- North end: ND 1804 in Buford

Location
- Country: United States
- State: North Dakota
- Counties: McKenzie, Williams

Highway system
- North Dakota State Highway System; Interstate; US; State
← ND 57	→ ND 59

North Dakota Highway 58 (ND 58) is a 9.8-mile-long (15.8 km) north–south state highway in the U.S. state of North Dakota. ND 58's southern terminus is at ND 200 in East Fairview, and the northern terminus is at ND 1804 in Buford. Upon crossing the Missouri River, travelers on the highway traverse between the Central Time Zone to the north and the Mountain Time Zone to the south.

== Major intersections ==
County	Location	mi	km	Destinations	Notes
McKenzie	East Fairview	0.000	0.000	ND 200 / Lewis and Clark Trail / 161st Avenue NW – Watford City, Fairview, Sidney	Roundabout; southern terminus; south end of LCT concurrency
Missouri River				Buford Bridge	
Williams	Buford	9.800	15.772	ND 1804 / Lewis and Clark Trail east – Williston, Bainville	Northern terminus; north end of LCT concurrency; highway continues as ND 1804 south/LCT east
1.000 mi = 1.609 km; 1.000 km = 0.621 mi: Concurrency terminus
