= Lancaster–Tolstoi Border Crossing =

Canada–United States border crossing

- US Border Inspection Station at Lancaster, MN

Location
- Country: United States; Canada
- Location: US 59 / PTH 59; US Port: 4151 US Highway 59, Lancaster, Minnesota 56735; Canadian Port: Manitoba Highway 59, Tolstoi, Manitoba R0A 2E0
- Coordinates: 49.000214°N 96.801414°W

Details
- Opened: 1950

Website
- https://www.cbp.gov/contact/ports/lancaster

The Lancaster–Tolstoi Border Crossing connects the city of Lancaster, Minnesota and community of Tolstoi, Manitoba on the Canada–United States border. It is the westernmost international border crossing in Minnesota following the closure of the Noyes–Emerson East Border Crossing in 2006. The border crossing is surrounded by Kittson County, Minnesota and the Municipality of Emerson - Franklin, Manitoba.

== History ==
This crossing was established in 1950 after U.S. Highway 59 was redirected to connect with the newly constructed Manitoba Highway 59 in order to provide a more direct route between Thief River Falls, Minnesota and Winnipeg, Manitoba. Prior to that time, U.S. Highway 59 veered west out of Lancaster and joined U.S. Route 75 near the now-closed port of entry at Noyes, Minnesota. When the border crossing was first established in 1950, the U.S. Customs Service operated out of a white two-story building some distance from the border. A brick inspection station was constructed at the border in 1965; this building was replaced with the current facility in 2004. The current Canadian border station was built in 1971.

== See also ==
- 2026 U.S. immigration enforcement protests
- List of Canada–United States border crossings
