= St. Vincent Township =

St. Vincent Township may refer to the following townships in the United States:

- St. Vincent Township, Kittson County, Minnesota
- St. Vincent Township, Ontario, a former part of Meaford, Ontario
