= North Dakota Highway 57 =

State highway in North Dakota, U.S.

North Dakota Highway 57
- ND 57 highlighted in red

Route information
- Maintained by NDDOT
- Length: 13 mi (21 km)
- Existed: by 1939–present

Major junctions
- West end: US 281 west of Fort Totten
- East end: ND 20 near Camp Grafton

Location
- Country: United States
- State: North Dakota
- Counties: Benson, Ramsey

Highway system
- North Dakota State Highway System; Interstate; US; State
← ND 56	→ ND 58

North Dakota Highway 57 (ND 57) is an east–west highway in North Dakota, running in Benson and Ramsey counties. It runs from U.S. Route 281 (US 281) west of Fort Totten to ND 20 near Camp Grafton.

Because of its proximity to Devils Lake, it has been impacted with the lake's increasing elevation; portions in and along the lake have had to be raised at least once to get the road elevation above the lake level. Despite this, the route remains vulnerable to flooding.

== Route description ==
ND 57 begins at an intersection with US 281 in Benson County and starts east toward Fort Totten along a two-lane road. A few miles east of this intersection, the route turns northeast and enters Fort Totten. After leaving Fort Totten, ND 57 crosses Devils Lake for the first time, entering the White Horse Hill National Game Preserve upon returning to land, but leaving the preserve shortly after. The route continues to travel east, curving along the shore of the lake until reaching a small island that is home to a casino. ND 57 then curves to the north and crosses Devils Lake a second time, meeting its eastern terminus with ND 20 while crossing the lake.

All of ND 57 is included in the National Highway System, a system of highways important to the nation's defense, economy, and mobility.

== Major intersections ==
County	Location	mi	km	Destinations	Notes
Benson		0.0	0.0	US 281 – Minnewaukan, Sheyenne, New Rockford	Western terminus
Ramsey		13.3	21.4	ND 20 – Warwick, Devils Lake	Eastern terminus
1.000 mi = 1.609 km; 1.000 km = 0.621 mi
