= Two Rivers (Red River of the North tributary) =

River in the United States of America

Location
- Country: United States

Physical characteristics
- Source
  - location: Minnesota
- Mouth
  - coordinates: 48°48′41″N 97°9′29″W

The Two Rivers is a 7.0-mile-long (11.3 km) river in Kittson County, northwestern Minnesota, in the United States. Formed by the North Branch of the Two Rivers and the South Branch of the Two Rivers, it is a tributary of the Red River of the North, with its outflow traveling north through Lake Winnipeg and the Nelson River to Hudson Bay.

The North Branch flows 61.4 miles (98.8 km) from a point 8 miles (13 km) east of Lancaster, Minnesota to its confluence with the South Branch. It runs entirely within Kittson County. The South Branch rises in Roseau County, approximately 5 miles (8 km) southeast of Badger, and flows 99.4 miles (160.0 km) west to the North Branch. It passes the town of Greenbush before entering Kittson County and passing the town of Lake Bronson. At Hallock, the Middle Branch enters from the east. The 28.0-mile (45.1 km) section of the South Branch downstream from the Middle Branch is shown on federal topographic maps as the main stem of Two Rivers.

== See also ==
- List of rivers of Minnesota
