= Posto de Migração das Portas do Cerco =

Posto Fronteiriço das Portas do Cerco
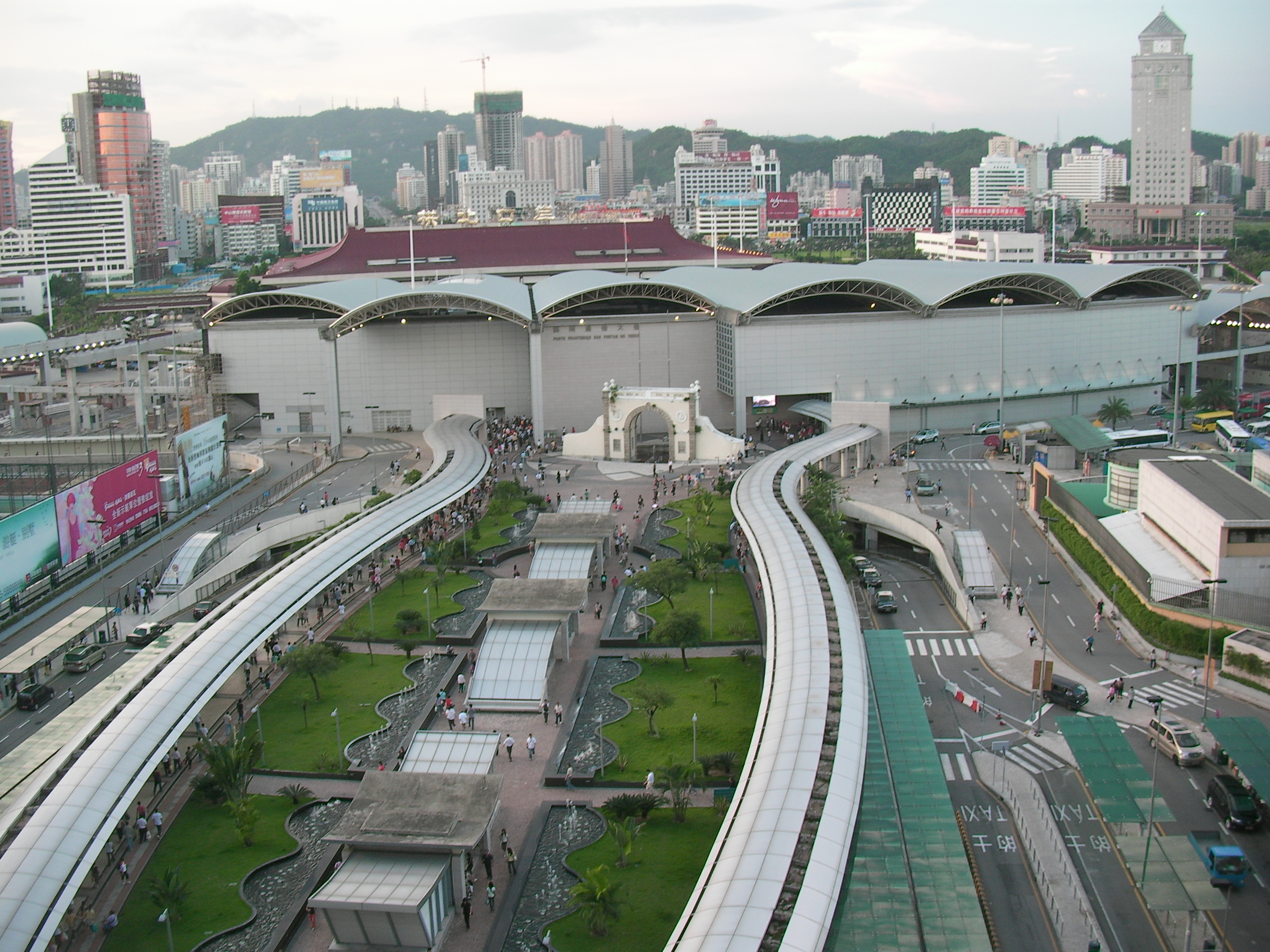
- The Border Gate checkpoint viewed from above.

Location
- Country: China-Macau

Details
- Opened: 15 January 2004

The Posto de Migração das Portas do Cerco or Border Gate Checkpoint is an immigration and customs checkpoint in the Portas do Cerco area in northern Macau, on its border with mainland China's Zhuhai.

It is one of three border crossings between Macau and mainland China, the others being Qingmao Port-Macau Frontier Post Building and the Lotus Bridge between Macao's Cotai and mainland China's Hengqin Island. Travellers entering Macau pass through immigration and customs on the ground floor of the building, while those departing Macau pass through customs and immigration on the first floor. Its counterpart in Zhuhai is Gongbei Port, through which travellers must pass before or after Portas do Cerco.

== History ==
The gate was opened on 15 January 2004 replacing the old Portas do Cerco checkpoint built in 1870.

== See also ==
- Portas do Cerco
