= Buford, North Dakota =

Buford
- Unincorporated community
- Location within the state of North Dakota Buford (the United States)
- Coordinates: 47°59′55″N 103°59′29″W
- Country: United States
- State: North Dakota
- County: Williams
- Time zone: UTC-6 (Central (CST))
  - Summer (DST): UTC-5 (CDT)
- Area code: 701

Buford is an unincorporated community in Williams County, North Dakota, United States. It is the nearest community to the Fort Union Trading Post National Historic Site.

== History ==
It is named for the nearby historic Fort Buford at the confluence of the Missouri and Yellowstone Rivers.

The population was 20 in 1940.

== Transportation ==
Amtrak’s Empire Builder, which operates between Seattle/Portland and Chicago, passes through the town on BNSF tracks, but makes no stop. The nearest station is located in Williston, 23 miles (37 km) to the northeast.
