= St. Vincent Township, Kittson County, Minnesota =

Township in Minnesota, United States

St. Vincent Township, Minnesota
- Township
- Location of St. Vincent Township, within Kittson County, Minnesota
- Coordinates: 48°57′16″N 97°8′22″W
- Country: United States
- State: Minnesota
- County: Kittson

Area
  - Total: 54.5 sq mi (141.1 km^{2})
  - Land: 54.2 sq mi (140.3 km^{2})
  - Water: 0.31 sq mi (0.8 km^{2})
- Elevation: 794 ft (242 m)

Population (2020)
  - Total: 43
  - Density: 0.79/sq mi (0.31/km^{2})
- Time zone: UTC-6 (Central (CST))
  - Summer (DST): UTC-5 (CDT)
- FIPS code: 27-58162
- GNIS feature ID: 0665535

St. Vincent Township is a township in Kittson County, Minnesota, United States. The population was 43 at the 2020 census.

St. Vincent Township was organized in 1880, and named for Vincent de Paul, a Roman Catholic saint.

== Geography ==
According to the United States Census Bureau, the township has a total area of 54.5 square miles (141.1 km^{2}), of which 54.2 square miles (140.3 km^{2}) is land and 0.3 square mile (0.8 km^{2}) (0.55%) is water. The unincorporated community of Noyes is situated at the north edge of the township, along the Canada–US border. The city of St. Vincent borders the township to the south.

== Demographics ==
As of the census of 2000, there were 74 people, 29 households, and 22 families residing in the township. The population density was 1.4 people per square mile (0.5/km^{2}). There were 51 housing units at an average density of 0.9/sq mi (0.4/km^{2}). The racial makeup of the township was 91.89% White, 8.11% from other races. Hispanic or Latino of any race were 6.76% of the population.

There were 29 households, out of which 27.6% had children under the age of 18 living with them, 65.5% were married couples living together, 3.4% had a female householder with no husband present, and 24.1% were non-families. 20.7% of all households were made up of individuals, and 10.3% had someone living alone who was 65 years of age or older. The average household size was 2.55 and the average family size was 3.

In the township the population was spread out, with 25.7% under the age of 18, 6.8% from 18 to 24, 24.3% from 25 to 44, 25.7% from 45 to 64, and 17.6% who were 65 years of age or older. The median age was 44 years. For every 100 females, there were 111.4 males. For every 100 females age 18 and over, there were 129.2 males.

The median income for a household in the township was $45,000, and the median income for a family was $57,500. Males had a median income of $35,000 versus $19,250 for females. The per capita income for the township was $20,491. There were no families and 2.1% of the population living below the poverty line, including no under eighteens and none of those over 64.
