= East Fairview, North Dakota =

- Census-designated place
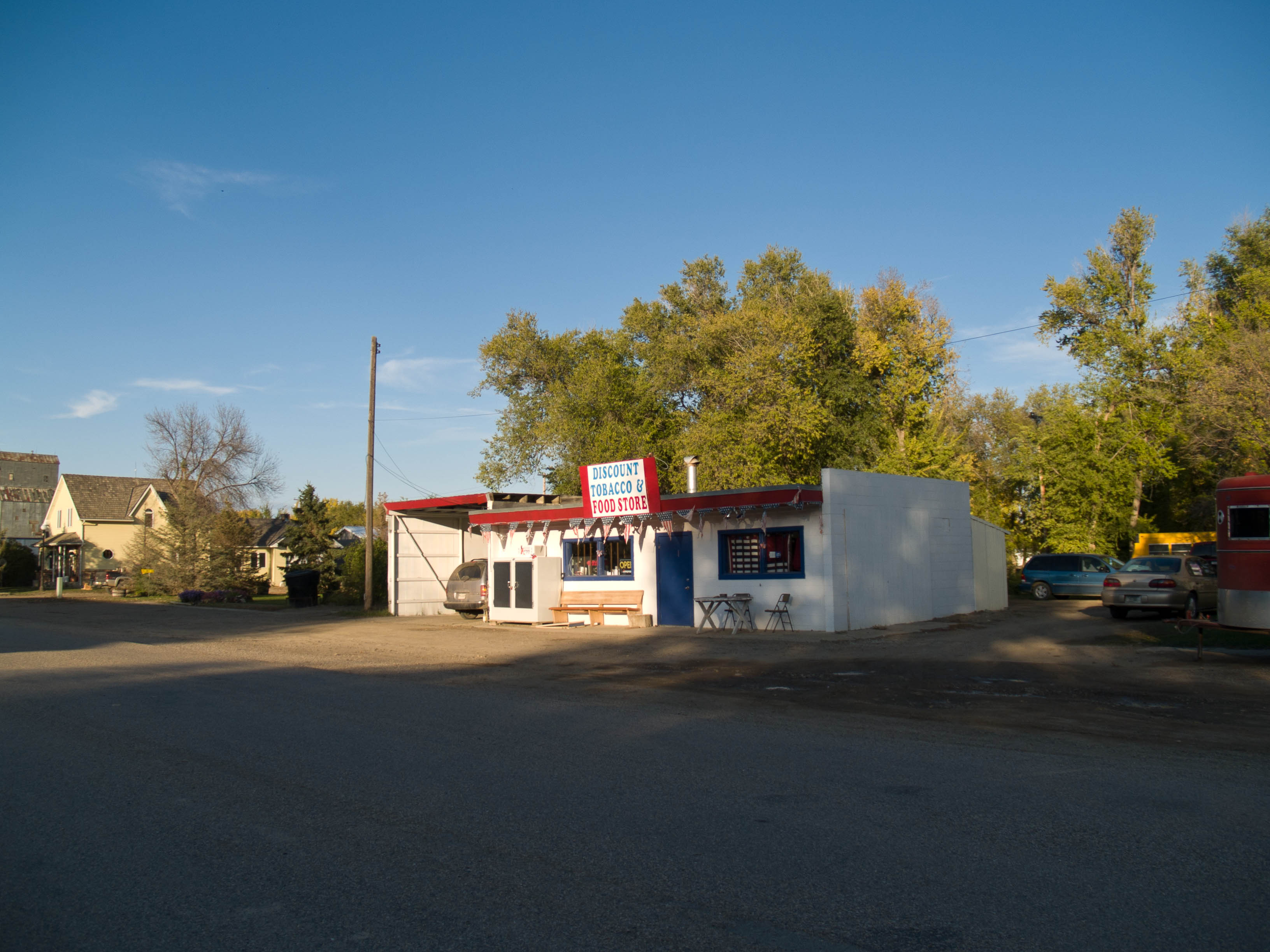
- Discount Tobacco and Food Store in East Fairview

- Location within North Dakota Location within the United States
- Coordinates: 47°51′20″N 104°02′15″W
- Country: United States
- State: North Dakota
- County: McKenzie

Area
  - Total: 0.38 sq mi (0.99 km^{2})
  - Land: 0.38 sq mi (0.99 km^{2})
  - Water: 0 sq mi (0.00 km^{2})
- Elevation: 1,903 ft (580 m)

Population (2020)
  - Total: 73
  - Density: 191.8/sq mi (74.07/km^{2})
- Time zone: UTC-7 (Mountain (MST))
  - Summer (DST): UTC-6 (MDT)
- ZIP Code: 59221
- Area code: 701
- GNIS feature ID: 2584341
- FIPS code: 38-21580

East Fairview is a census-designated place and unincorporated community in McKenzie County, North Dakota, United States. Its population was 73 as of the 2020 census. The community is located on the North Dakota-Montana border, which separates it from Fairview, Montana.

== Geography ==
East Fairview is in western McKenzie County. North Dakota Highway 200 forms the northern edge of the CDP. The highway leads east 21 miles (34 km) to Alexander and 41 miles (66 km) to Watford City, the McKenzie county seat. To the west it enters Montana and becomes Montana Highway 200, which passes through Fairview and leads southwest 11 miles (18 km) to Sidney.

According to the U.S. Census Bureau, the East Fairview CDP has an area of 0.38 square miles (0.98 km^{2}), of which 0.002 square miles (0.005 km^{2}), or 0.52%, are water. The Yellowstone River passes 3 miles (5 km) east of the community, 9 miles (14 km) south of its mouth at the Missouri River.

== Demographics ==
Historical population
Census	Pop.	Note	%±
1920	175		—
1930	155		−11.4%
2010	76		—
2020	73		−3.9%
U.S. Decennial Census
