= Gongbei Port of Entry =

Checkpoint between mainland China and Macau

Coordinates: 22°13′07″N 113°32′56″E

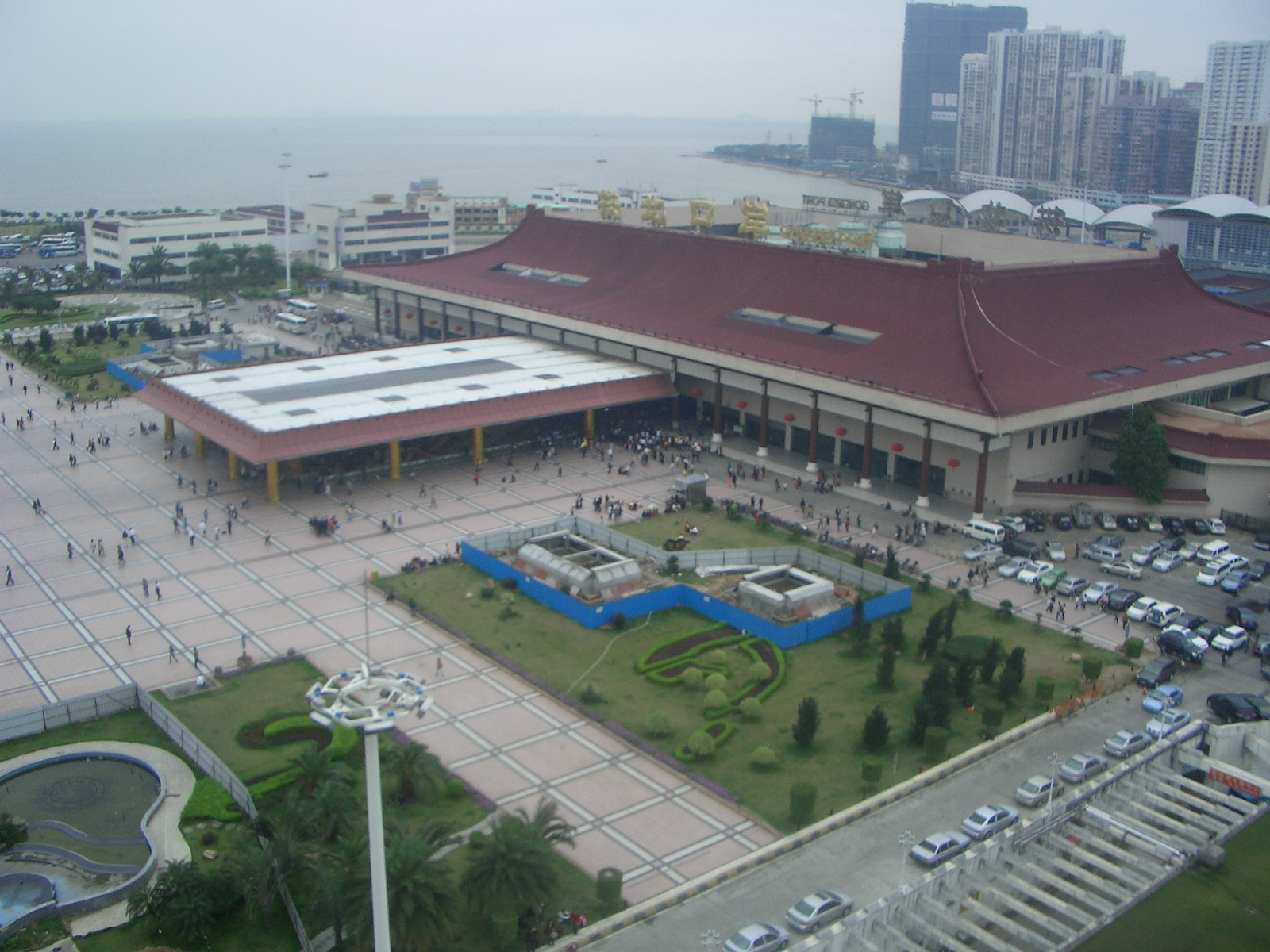
The Gongbei Port of Entry viewed from above

The Gongbei Port (Chinese: 拱北口岸; pinyin: Gǒngběi Kǒuàn; Jyutping: Gung^{2}baak^{1} Hau^{2}ngon^{6}) is an immigration and customs checkpoint located in Zhuhai in mainland China, on its border with Macau. It is operated by the Bureau of Exit and Entry Administration of the Ministry of Public Security, and the General Administration of Customs.

== History ==
In 2013, more than 99 million travelers went through the Gongbei Port of Entry. This grew to 134 million in 2018.

In October 2016, the Gongbei Port of Entry started to use an AI-powered humanoid robot, the Sanbot. It has been programmed to respond to over 3,000 commonly asked questions and provide guidance on local laws and regulations. The robot can quiz passengers in different languages.

== Description ==
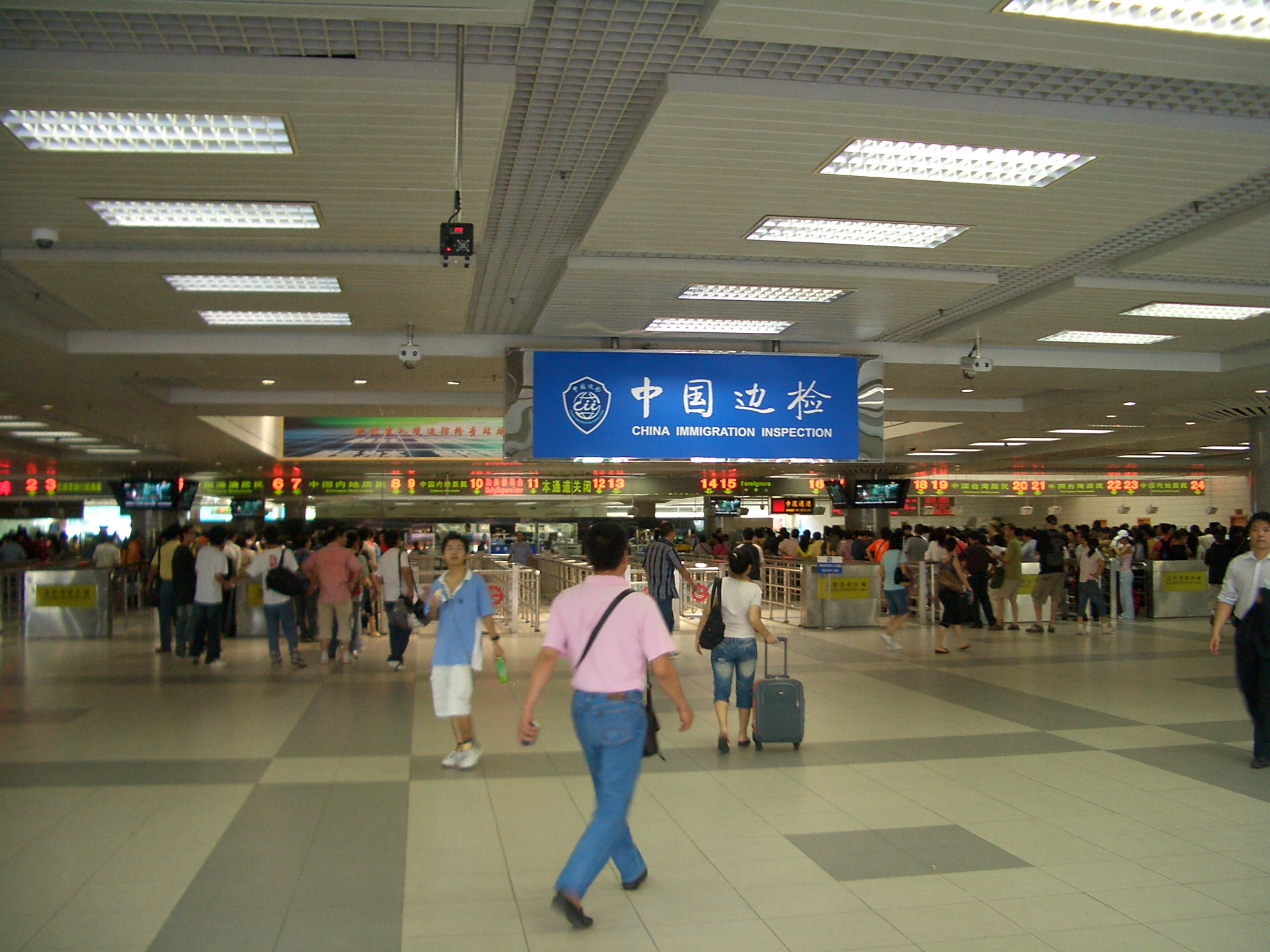
The departure hall at Gongbei

The Gongbei Port of Entry is located in the Gongbei Subdistrict (jiedao) in the southeastern part of Zhuhai, and is one of four ports of entry on land between mainland China and Macau (One being the Lotus Bridge, connecting Hengqin, Zhuhai in mainland China with Cotai, Macau (Hengqin port). Another is the Hong Kong-Zhuhai-Macao bridge port, the other Qingmao port).

Immigration and customs for travellers exiting mainland China are to the east, while immigration and customs for those entering mainland China are to the west.

There is a large underground shopping mall under the plaza north of the port-of-entry building.

The counterpart in Macau, through which travellers must pass before or after Gongbei, is the Portas do Cerco, operated by the Serviço de Migração of the Corpo de Polícia de Segurança Pública, and the Serviços de Alfândega.

== Zhuhai Macao Border Crossing Facilities ==
On the completion of the Hong Kong–Zhuhai–Macau Bridge in December 2017, a separate Gongbei Port of Entry be in use on an infilled island that will serve as the custom control area for the bridge's western terminus. Traffic from the bridge will proceed towards Gongbei and then westward to Nanping.

== Transport to the border ==
Gongbei Bus Station, a coach station, with transport to Guangzhou and other cities in Guangdong and elsewhere in China, is located within walking distance from the border crossing.

Zhuhai Railway Station, with high-speed rail service to Guangzhou South Railway Station, is located beside the border crossing. An extension of Zhuhai Tram Line 1 was planned to link Gongbei to the station and onward to central Zhuhai.

== See also ==
- Port of entry
- Qingmao Port
