= St. Vincent, Minnesota =

City in Minnesota, United States

- City
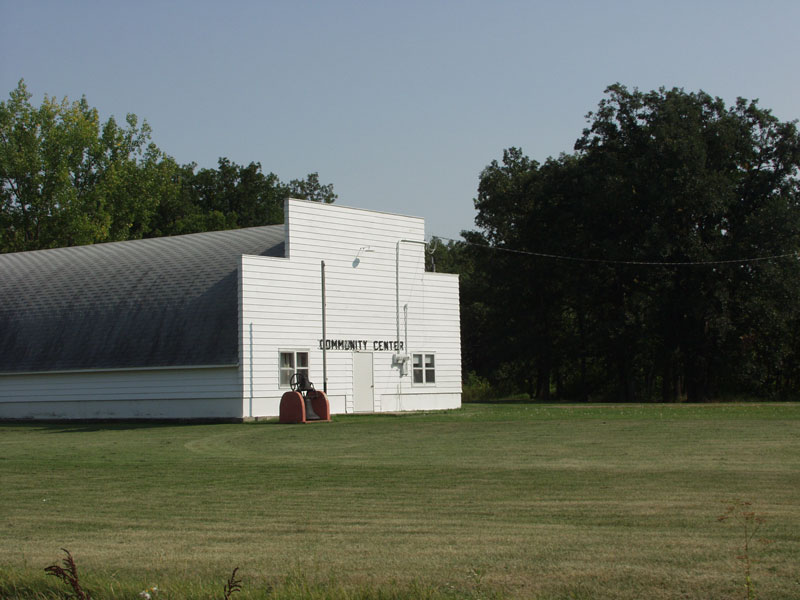
- St Vincent Community Center

- Location of St. Vincent, Minnesota
- Coordinates: 48°58′6″N 97°13′34″W
- Country: United States
- State: Minnesota
- County: Kittson
- Incorporated: May 23, 1857

Government
  - Mayor: Evan Herberg

Area
  - Total: 1.082 sq mi (2.803 km^{2})
  - Land: 1.027 sq mi (2.659 km^{2})
  - Water: 0.056 sq mi (0.144 km^{2})
- Elevation: 794 ft (242 m)

Population (2020)
  - Total: 57
  - Estimate (2022): 52
  - Density: 55.5/sq mi (21.44/km^{2})
- Time zone: UTC−6 (Central (CST))
  - Summer (DST): UTC−5 (CDT)
- ZIP Code: 56755
- Area code: 218
- FIPS code: 27-58144
- GNIS feature ID: 0651079
- Sales tax: 6.875%

St. Vincent is a city in Kittson County, Minnesota, United States. The population was 57 at the 2020 census.

== History ==
St. Vincent, which is directly across the Red River from Pembina, was initially incorporated in 1857, just prior to statehood. Many of the earliest settlers to what would become Pembina and St. Vincent were Métis, going back to the late 18th century. In 1878, the St. Paul & Pacific Railroad line reached St. Vincent and opened the area to settlement. With the railroad coming through, other settlers began arriving to stake their claims.

== Geography ==
According to the United States Census Bureau, the city has a total area of 1.083 square miles (2.80 km^{2}), of which 1.027 square miles (2.66 km^{2}) is land and 0.056 square miles (0.15 km^{2}) is water.

The community is the westernmost community in Minnesota. It is situated on the banks of the Red River of the North, in the Red River Valley. It grew from one of the oldest settlements in the region, when it was part of an early fur-trading post established by Peter Grant in 1793. The city of Pembina, North Dakota borders it on the west, across the Red River of the North.

Minnesota Highway 171, U.S. Highway 75, 8th Street, and Pacific Avenue are four of the main routes in and around the community.

North Dakota Highway 59 and Interstate 29 are also nearby.

== Demographics ==
Historical population
| Census | Pop. | Note | %± |
|---|---|---|---|
| 1900 | 256 | | — |
| 1910 | 328 | | 28.1% |
| 1920 | 343 | | 4.6% |
| 1930 | 304 | | −11.4% |
| 1940 | 327 | | 7.6% |
| 1950 | 272 | | −16.8% |
| 1960 | 217 | | −20.2% |
| 1970 | 177 | | −18.4% |
| 1980 | 141 | | −20.3% |
| 1990 | 116 | | −17.7% |
| 2000 | 117 | | 0.9% |
| 2010 | 64 | | −45.3% |
| 2020 | 57 | | −10.9% |
| 2022 (est.) | 52 | | −8.8% |
U.S. Decennial Census; 2020 Census

=== 2010 census ===
As of the 2010 census, there were 64 people, 29 households, and 18 families living in the city. The population density was 59.3 inhabitants per square mile (22.9/km^{2}). There were 40 housing units at an average density of 37.0 per square mile (14.3/km^{2}). The racial makeup of the city was 98.4% White and 1.6% Native American. Hispanic or Latino of any race were 6.3% of the population.

There were 29 households, of which 10.3% had children under the age of 18 living with them, 55.2% were married couples living together, 6.9% had a female householder with no husband present, and 37.9% were non-families. 34.5% of all households were made up of individuals, and 17.2% had someone living alone who was 65 years of age or older. The average household size was 2.21 and the average family size was 2.89.

The median age in the city was 49 years. 18.7% of residents were under the age of 18; 6.3% were between the ages of 18 and 24; 17.2% were from 25 to 44; 28.2% were from 45 to 64; and 29.7% were 65 years of age or older. The gender makeup of the city was 54.7% male and 45.3% female.

=== 2000 census ===
As of the 2000 census, there were 117 people, 48 households, and 28 families living in the city. The population density was 108.0 inhabitants per square mile (41.7/km^{2}). There were 51 housing units at an average density of 47.1 per square mile (18.2/km^{2}). The racial makeup of the city was 93.16% White, 3.42% Native American, 2.56% Asian, and 0.85% from two or more races.

There were 48 households, out of which 29.2% had children under the age of 18 living with them, 54.2% were married couples living together, 4.2% had a female householder with no husband present, and 39.6% were non-families. 35.4% of all households were made up of individuals, and 14.6% had someone living alone who was 65 years of age or older. The average household size was 2.44 and the average family size was 3.17.

In the city, the population was spread out, with 26.5% under the age of 18, 5.1% from 18 to 24, 27.4% from 25 to 44, 28.2% from 45 to 64, and 12.8% who were 65 years of age or older. The median age was 38 years. For every 100 females, there were 116.7 males. For every 100 females age 18 and over, there were 109.8 males.

The median income for a household in the city was $30,500, and the median income for a family was $41,667. Males had a median income of $22,292 versus $16,250 for females. The per capita income for the city was $13,322. There were 15.4% of families and 21.5% of the population living below the poverty line, including 27.3% of under eighteens and 75.0% of those over 64.
