= Lancaster, Minnesota =

City in Minnesota, United States

Lancaster
- City
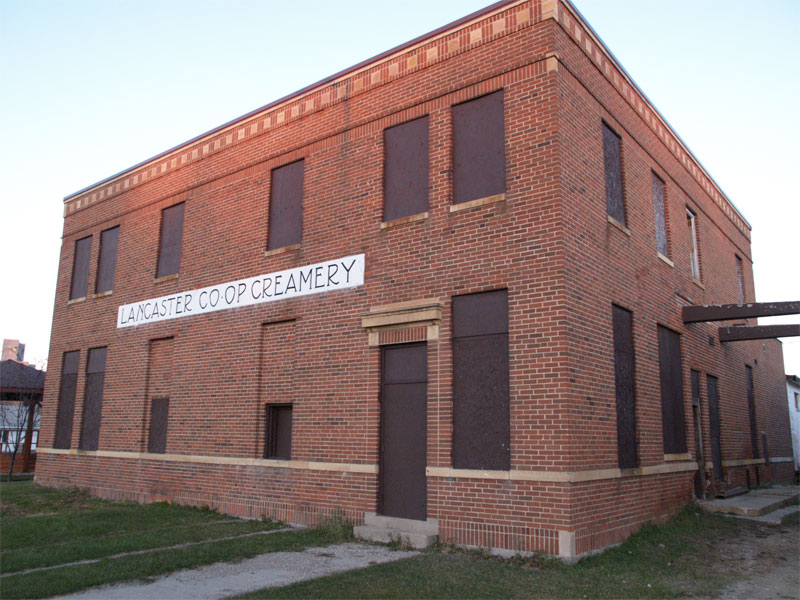
- Lancaster Co-op Creamery building

- Location of Lancaster, Minnesota
- Coordinates: 48°51′32″N 96°48′17″W
- Country: United States
- State: Minnesota
- County: Kittson

Area
  - Total: 2.34 sq mi (6.05 km^{2})
  - Land: 2.34 sq mi (6.05 km^{2})
  - Water: 0 sq mi (0.00 km^{2})
- Elevation: 909 ft (277 m)

Population (2020)
  - Total: 364
  - Density: 155.9/sq mi (60.21/km^{2})
- Time zone: UTC-6 (CST)
  - Summer (DST): UTC-5 (CDT)
- ZIP code: 56735
- Area code: 218
- FIPS code: 27-35378
- GNIS feature ID: 0646463
- Website: lancastermn.org

Lancaster is a city in Kittson County, Minnesota, United States. As of the 2020 census, the city population was 364.

== History ==
Lancaster was incorporated in 1904 along a Soo Line Railroad line running from Glenwood to the Canada–US border. The city was named after a railroad official believed to have come from Lancashire County in England.

== Geography ==
According to the United States Census Bureau, the city has an area of 2.30 square miles (5.96 km^{2}), all land.

Lancaster is along U.S. Highway 59 (northern terminus), at the junction with Kittson County Roads 4, 5, and 6. The North Branch Two Rivers flows nearby. The Canadian border is nine miles north.

== Demographics ==
Historical population
Census	Pop.	Note	%±
1910	204		—
1920	354		73.5%
1930	456		28.8%
1940	473		3.7%
1950	536		13.3%
1960	462		−13.8%
1970	382		−17.3%
1980	368		−3.7%
1990	342		−7.1%
2000	363		6.1%
2010	340		−6.3%
2020	364		7.1%
U.S. Decennial Census; 2020 Census

=== 2010 census ===
As of the census of 2010, there were 340 people, 163 households, and 98 families living in the city. The population density was 147.8 inhabitants per square mile (57.1/km^{2}). There were 189 housing units at an average density of 82.2 per square mile (31.7/km^{2}). The racial makeup of the city was 98.8% White, 0.6% Asian, and 0.6% from other races. Hispanic or Latino of any race were 1.5% of the population.

There were 163 households, of which 20.9% had children under the age of 18 living with them, 53.4% were married couples living together, 5.5% had a female householder with no husband present, 1.2% had a male householder with no wife present, and 39.9% were non-families. 37.4% of all households were made up of individuals, and 22.7% had someone living alone who was 65 years of age or older. The average household size was 2.09 and the average family size was 2.74.

The median age in the city was 47.6 years. 20.3% of residents were under the age of 18; 8.9% were between the ages of 18 and 24; 16.7% were from 25 to 44; 30.9% were from 45 to 64; and 23.2% were 65 years of age or older. The gender makeup of the city was 47.1% male and 52.9% female.

=== 2000 census ===
As of the census of 2000, there were 363 people, 154 households, and 91 families living in the city. The population density was 161.6 inhabitants per square mile (62.4/km^{2}). There were 193 housing units at an average density of 85.9 per square mile (33.2/km^{2}). The racial makeup of the city was 98.90% White, 0.28% Native American, 0.28% Asian, and 0.55% from two or more races. Hispanic or Latino of any race were 1.10% of the population.

There were 154 households, out of which 31.8% had children under the age of 18 living with them, 48.7% were married couples living together, 6.5% had a female householder with no husband present, and 40.9% were non-families. 39.0% of all households were made up of individuals, and 22.7% had someone living alone who was 65 years of age or older. The average household size was 2.36 and the average family size was 3.19.

In the city, the population was spread out, with 29.5% under the age of 18, 7.7% from 18 to 24, 25.1% from 25 to 44, 19.6% from 45 to 64, and 18.2% who were 65 years of age or older. The median age was 38 years. For every 100 females, there were 107.4 males. For every 100 females age 18 and over, there were 95.4 males.

The median income for a household in the city was $33,750, and the median income for a family was $47,083. Males had a median income of $31,346 versus $27,000 for females. The per capita income for the city was $16,191. About 9.2% of families and 9.7% of the population were below the poverty line, including 11.1% of those under age 18 and 10.8% of those age 65 or over.

== See also ==
- Lancaster-Tolstoi Border Crossing
