= Noyes, Minnesota =

Unincorporated community in Minnesota, United States

Noyes
- Unincorporated community
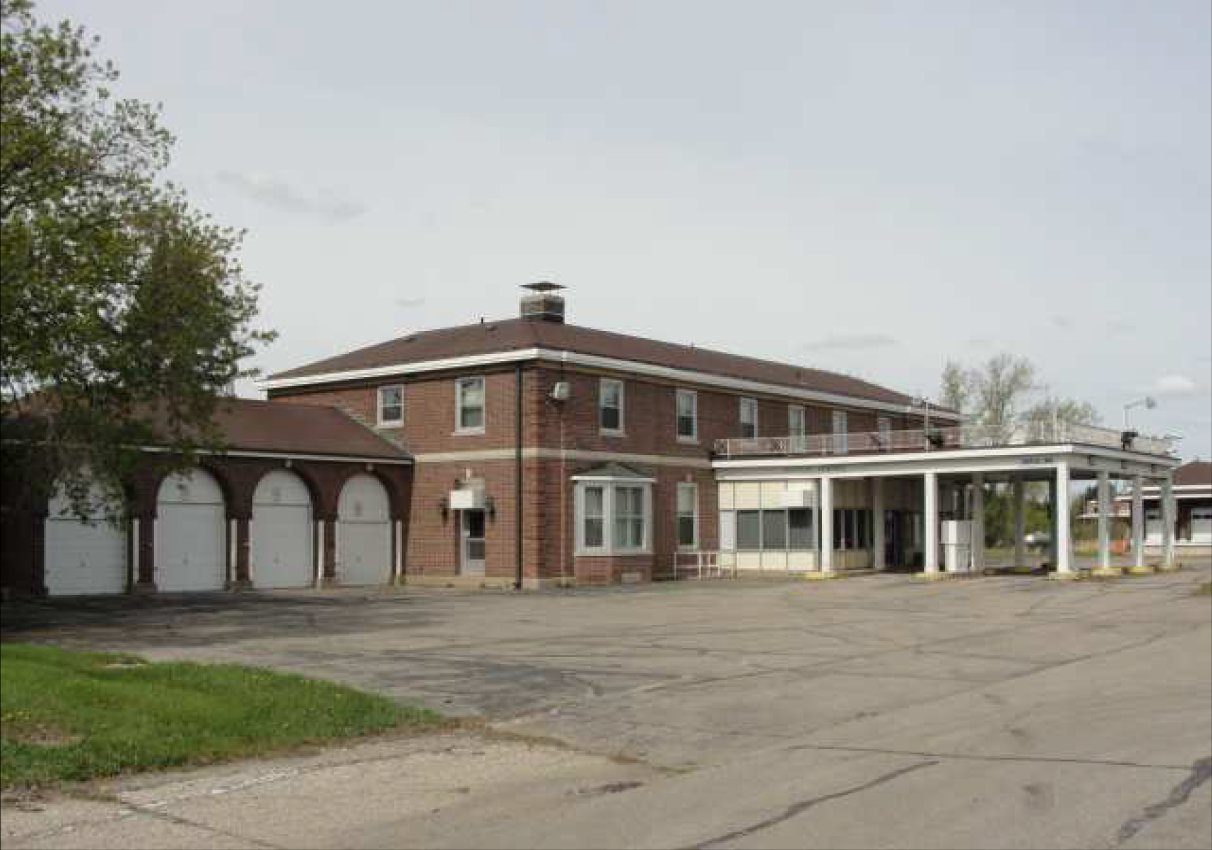
- Noyes Customs and Immigration Station

- Location of Noyes Noyes (the United States)
- Coordinates: 48°59′51″N 97°12′16″W
- Country: United States
- State: Minnesota
- County: Kittson County
- Township: St. Vincent Township
- Elevation: 787 ft (240 m)
- Time zone: UTC−6 (Central (CST))
  - Summer (DST): UTC−5 (CDT)
- ZIP code: 56740
- Area code: 218
- GNIS feature ID: 648769

Noyes (/ˈnɔɪz/ NOYZ) is an unincorporated community in St. Vincent Township, Kittson County, Minnesota, United States. Located in the extreme northwestern corner of the state on the Canada–United States border, Noyes is the northern terminus of U.S. Highway 75 and site of a former road border crossing. U.S. Customs and Border Protection operates a customs inspection station for the Canadian Pacific Kansas City and BNSF Railway lines that enter from Canada at Noyes. The community of Emerson, Manitoba, lies adjacent to Noyes on the Canadian side of the border.

== History ==
A post office called Noyes was established in 1927, and remained in operation until 1990. The community was named for J. A. Noyes, a customs agent.

Today, Noyes is essentially a quiet community. Because of its proximity to the flood-prone Red River, it is protected by a levee which extends south from Emerson. The levee was built in 1989 as part of the International Levee agreement between both countries. When flooding cuts off Noyes from the rest of the United States, a local state of emergency is declared, allowing residents and emergency personnel to move freely across the border within the levee.

=== Customs and Immigration Station ===
Noyes was an important border-crossing location going back to the days of ox roads and later was one of the busiest ports of entry west of the Great Lakes for rail and road traffic. Since the construction of Interstate 29 on the North Dakota side of the nearby Red River, U.S. Highway 75 has declined in importance. The Canadian government closed Emerson port of entry opposite Noyes in 2003, while the Port of Noyes closed in 2006, leaving the U.S. 75 from the south the only access to Noyes. Travelers must now use the border crossing located less than 2 miles (3.2 km) to the west, but a 7-mile (11 km) trek from Noyes, through Pembina, North Dakota, to Interstate 29. The rail border crossing remains open, but is now managed by the Port of Pembina.

The 1931 Colonial Revival Noyes Customs and Immigration Station is listed on the NRHP as a well-preserved example of the nation's first purpose-built border checkpoints at land crossings.

== See also ==
- List of Canada–United States border crossings
