= U.S. Route 75 =

Highway in the United States

U.S. Route 75
- US 75 highlighted in red

Route information
- Length: 1,239 mi (1,994 km)
- Existed: 1926–present

Major junctions
- South end: I-345 / Spur 366 at Dallas, TX
- I-635 at Dallas, TX; I-40 / US 62 at Henryetta, OK; I-44 at Tulsa, OK; I-35 / US 50 near Lebo, KS; I-335 / I-470 / Kansas Turnpike at Topeka, KS; I-70 / US 40 in Topeka, KS; I-80 at Omaha, NE; I-29 at Sioux City, IA; I-90 at Luverne, MN; I-94 / US 52 at Moorhead, MN; US 2 at Crookston, MN
- North end: Canadian border at Noyes, MN; Port of Entry closed

Location
- Country: United States
- States: Texas, Oklahoma, Kansas, Nebraska, Iowa, Minnesota

Highway system
- United States Numbered Highway System; List; Special; Divided
| ← US 74 | → US 76 |

U.S. Route 75 is a north–south U.S. Highway that runs 1,239 miles (1,994 km) in the central United States. The highway's northern terminus is located at the Canadian border near Noyes, Minnesota, at a now-closed border crossing. From this point, the highway once continued farther north as Manitoba Highway 75. Its southern terminus is located at Interstate 345 (I-345) and Texas State Highway Spur 366 (Spur 366) in Dallas, Texas, where US 75 is known as North Central Expressway.

US 75 was previously a cross-country route, from Canada to the Gulf of Mexico at Galveston, Texas, but the entire segment south of Dallas has been decommissioned in favor of I-45; a cutoff section of town-to-town surface road having become Texas State Highway 75.

== Route description ==
=== Texas ===
The first freeway in Texas was a several-mile stretch of US 75 (now I-45)—The Gulf Freeway—opened to Houston traffic on October 1, 1948. The stretch of US 75 between I-30 and the Oklahoma state line has exits numbered consecutively from 1 to 75 (with occasional A and B designations), excluding 9-19. All other Texas freeways that have exit numbers are coordinated with mile markers.

US 75 and Interstate 635 cross at the High Five Interchange, a five level exchange in Dallas, Texas.

North of Denison, US 75 runs concurrently with US 69.

=== Oklahoma ===
US 75 remains concurrent to US 69 from the Texas border north to Atoka. While US 69 continues to the northeast as a multilane highway, US 75 turns north to serve several small communities between Atoka and Henryetta. Through travellers bypass this segment of US 75 via US 69 and the Indian Nation Turnpike, where the speed limit is 75 miles per hour (121 km/h).

From Henryetta through Tulsa and on through Bartlesville to the Kansas State Line, US 75 is once again a multilane highway.

In the early 1990s, some portions of US 75 in Oklahoma were slated to become part of the Interstate Highway System. The 1991 Intermodal Surface Transportation Efficiency Act (ISTEA) states that "upon the request of the Oklahoma State highway agency, the Secretary shall designate the portion of United States Route 69 from the Oklahoma–Texas State line to Checotah in the State of Oklahoma as a part of the Interstate System." This would have created an Interstate route from I-40 south to the Texas line, including the portion of US 75 co-signed with US 69 south of Atoka. The legislation was unclear whether the route would enter Texas to connect with or become an extension of I-45. A current plan is to construct a new segment of the Oklahoma Turnpike along the US 69 corridor to bring it to corridor standards.

=== Kansas ===
A major north–south artery in Kansas, US 75 enters the state at Caney. It passes through Independence and crosses I-35 south of Olivet at the BETO Junction. From I-35 to Melvern Lake, US 75 is a Super-2 highway, with controlled access interchanges at Township Road, K-278, and K-31 southbound. From Melvern Lake to just north of Lyndon, US 75 and K-31 share a long concurrency. At US 56 near Scranton US 75 becomes a freeway. There is no direct access to the Kansas Turnpike from US 75, but the highway joins with I-470 less than one mile (1.6 km) from I-470's interchange with the turnpike. US 75 and I-470 run together along the west side of Topeka to I-70. US 75 turns east along I-70 for about three miles (4.8 km) before exiting northbound as a freeway. This freeway segment runs to Elmont, then becomes an expressway to Holton. The remainder of US 75 in Kansas is two lanes. The highway exits the state north of Sabetha.

There was a US 75 Alternate in Topeka. It was on Topeka Boulevard and was the route US 75 originally took through the city.

=== Nebraska ===
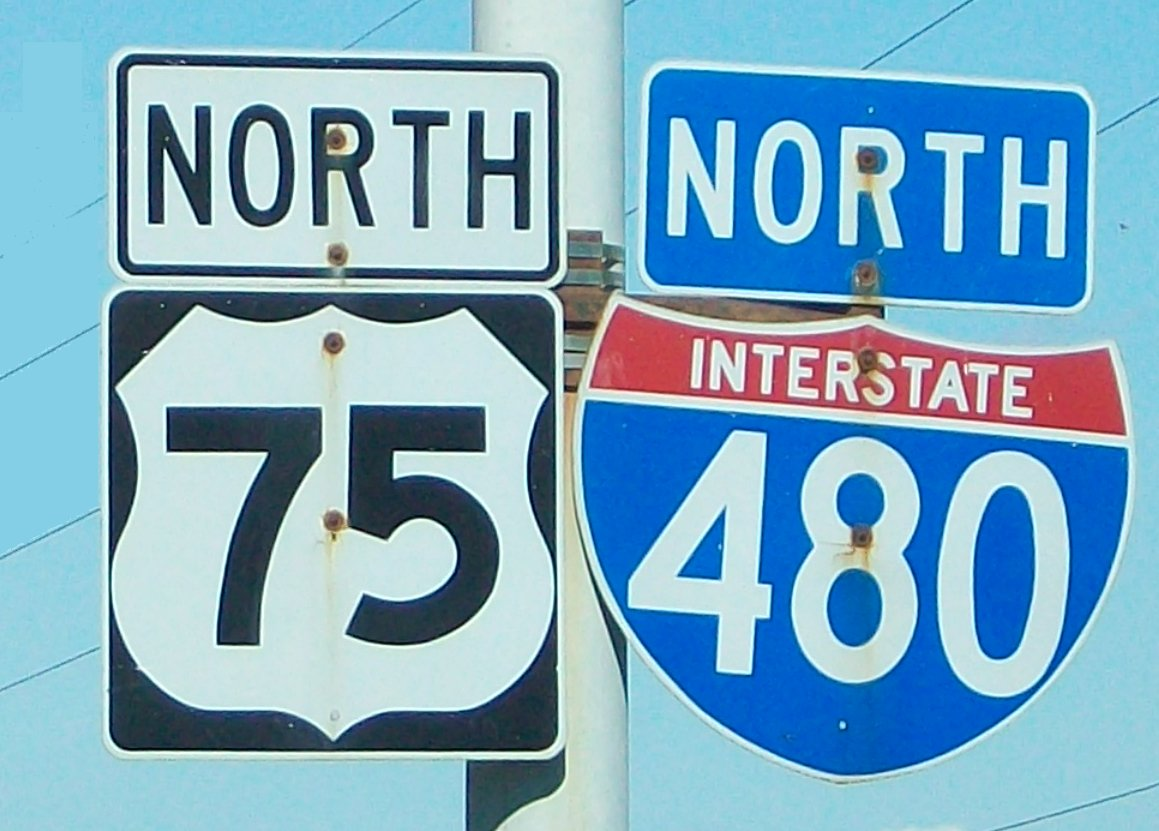
U.S. Route 75/I-480 sign in Omaha

US 75 enters Nebraska south of Dawson. From Nebraska City northward, it closely parallels the Missouri River. A brief section that serves as a bypass for Nebraska City is an expressway called the J. Sterling Morton Beltway. Nebraska City itself is served with Business Route US 75. US 75 and US 34 overlap from Union to Plattsmouth. North of Plattsmouth, US 75 becomes the Kennedy Freeway, serving as an arterial highway through Bellevue and the South Omaha neighborhood of Omaha. It follows I-480 briefly through central Omaha before branching off as the North Omaha Freeway. From I-680 northward to Nashville (three miles [4.8 km] south of Fort Calhoun) US 75 is an expressway. South of Nashville it becomes a two-lane road again. It is briefly concurrent with US 30 in Blair. It joins with US 77 at Winnebago. The two highways run together until their junction with I-129 and US 20 at South Sioux City. US 75 follows I-129 and US 20 towards the Missouri River and Iowa.

=== Iowa ===
US 75 is a major north–south artery in the northwestern corner of Iowa. It enters the state by a Missouri River crossing at Sioux City concurrent with I-129 and US 20. US 75 and US 20 run together on a freeway bypass around the southeast side of Sioux City before US 20 turns east at Gordon Drive. US 75 continues as a freeway to the Woodbury–Plymouth county line, where it becomes an expressway. This expressway becomes a freeway bypass of Le Mars. North of Le Mars, US 75 exits off the freeway bypass, which continues on as Iowa Highway 60, and turns north. US 75 continues as a two-lane, undivided highway passing through Sioux Center and Rock Rapids before leaving the state north of Iowa Highway 9.

The segment from the Missouri River to LeMars is part of a larger expressway project that will eventually provide a direct connection between Sioux City and the Twin Cities region in Minnesota.

=== Minnesota ===
In Minnesota, US 75 stays very close to the state's western border. It passes through few large towns. US 75 enters Minnesota south of Luverne near Ash Creek and Steen, and passes through Pipestone, Canby, and Breckenridge. It is the main north–south route through Moorhead. North of Moorhead, the route turns northeast to pass through Crookston (east of Grand Forks, North Dakota), then turns northwest towards the Red River of the North. US 75 does not cross the Red River, ending instead at the Canadian border at the unincorporated community of Noyes. It is not legally possible to cross the border at Noyes as the Noyes–Emerson East Border Crossing closed in July 2006 (however, since there is no security, it is possible to illegally bypass the old crossing into Emerson). Border traffic is instead directed to the nearby crossing in Pembina, North Dakota, (via MN 171, ND 59 and I-29). Manitoba Highway 75 previously continued on the other side of the Noyes border crossing, but has since been rerouted to the Pembina crossing.

All 408 miles (657 km) of US 75 in Minnesota is officially designated the Historic King of Trails, sponsored by the towns along the route. The King of Trails was in fact the historic Auto Trail name for this road before the trunk highway system was commissioned in 1920.

Legally, the Minnesota section of US 75 is defined as Routes 6 and 175 in Minnesota Statutes §§ 161.114(2) and 161.115(106).

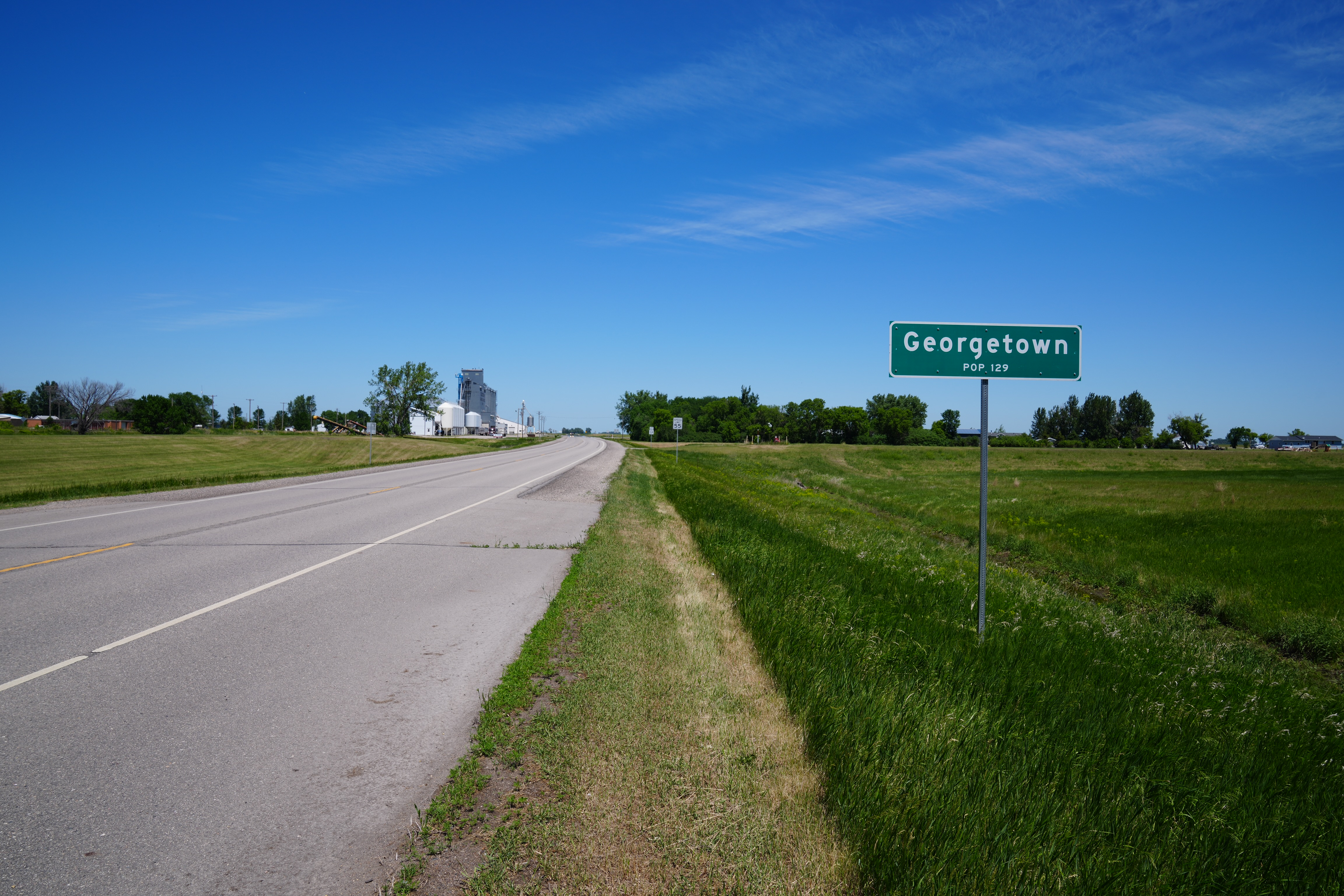
Georgetown, Minnesota is on U.S. Route 75

== History ==
=== Texas ===
In the initial assignment of state highways in 1917, Dallas-Fort Worth and Houston were connected by a branch of SH 2 (SH 2, the Meridian Highway), which ran via Waco and Bryan and continued on to Galveston. The more direct route followed by US 75 was not initially part of the system between Richland (connected to Dallas by SH 14) and Huntsville (connected to Houston by SH 19). This Richland–Huntsville cutoff was added by 1919 as State Highway 32, and US 75 was assigned to the alignment, as well as SH 6 north of Dallas, in 1926. The branch of SH 2, which US 75 followed between Houston and Galveston, eventually became part of SH 6, and these numbers were dropped in the 1939 renumbering.

Prior to the coming of the Interstate Highway System in the late 1950s, the only improvements to US 75 in Texas beyond building a two-lane paved roadway were in the Houston and Dallas areas. The highways in and near these cities included some of the first freeways in the state, however: the Gulf Freeway (Houston) and the Central Expressway (Dallas). When Interstate 45 was built in the 1960s, its alignment bypassed many of the towns and built-up areas between downtown Dallas and Houston. The bypassed routes retained the US 75 designation until the designation was truncated to downtown Dallas in 1987. Many of the original alignments continue to exist under other designations.

In Dallas, the route followed what is now the Good Latimer Expressway (formerly Spur 559) southeast, out of downtown, along US 175 and south along SH 310.

Near Ferris, Trumbull, Palmer, Ennis, and Corsicana I-45 veers east to avoid the more populated areas. The old US 75 alignments through these towns, decommissioned in 1987, now carry the following designations:

- Interstate 45 Business (originally Loop 560) through Ferris
- Loop 561 through Trumbull
- Interstate 45 Business through Palmer (originally Loop 562)
- Spur 469, Interstate 45 Business (originally U.S. Highway 287 and Spur 563) through Ennis
- Interstate 45 Business (originally Loop 564) through Corsicana

Through Streetman, Fairfield, Buffalo, Centerville, Madisonville, Huntsville, New Waverly, Willis, and Conroe, US 75 followed what is now SH 75.

In Galveston, the alignment of SH 87 from 20th Street to the southern terminus of I-45 was also part of US 75 until its 1987 truncation.

In other cases alignments were bypassed while US 75 remained in existence; they now carry the following designations:

- SH 3 through La Marque, Dickinson, League City, South Houston and Houston, bypassed 1952
- SH 5 from north of Dallas via Plano, McKinney, Anna and Van Alstyne to Howe, bypassed 1959-1967
- SH 91 from Sherman to Denison, bypassed 1984
- Spur 503 and U.S. Highway 69 around downtown Denison to near Oklahoma
  - SH 91 through downtown Denison, bypassed 1957

=== Oklahoma ===
The main line of US 75 between Okmulgee and Tulsa, known locally as the "Okmulgee Beeline", is a modern four-lane highway. The prior route continues to exist, beginning with North Oklahoma Avenue in Okmulgee and becoming Old Highway 75 to the town of Beggs, Oklahoma. The part of the original route from Beggs north to the city of Sapulpa, Oklahoma was re-designated, together with a connecting segment along SH 16 between new US 75 and Beggs, as Alternate US 75, also signed as US 75A or SH 75A. Historically, the old US 75 met US 66 (now SH 66) in Sapulpa, and the routes were co-signed into Tulsa.

=== Nebraska ===
Development of US 75 in North Omaha was the source of much contention in when it was constructed. One state agency reports, "Construction of the North Omaha Freeway, coupled with social unrest in the 1970s, greatly impacted the North Omaha area. One neighborhood experienced a 30 percent housing loss and major increase in crime." Further, the City of Omaha refused to complete upgrades to the freeway, eliminating the possibility of achieving the I-580 designation planned for it.

=== Nebraska–Iowa ===
From when the route was created in 1926 until 1984, US 75 left Nebraska in Omaha, crossing over the Missouri River into Council Bluffs, Iowa over the Ak-Sar-Ben Bridge before 1966, and the I-480 Bridge from 1966 until 1984. US 75 then followed an alignment that went through western Iowa between Council Bluffs and Sioux City. After I-29 was built, US 75 was eventually moved onto I-29. In 1984, US 75 was rerouted into Nebraska to replace most of US 73. Previously, US 73 was concurrent with US 75 between Dawson, Nebraska and Omaha, and occupied the current segment of US 75 between Omaha and Winnebago.

== Major intersections ==
Texas
I-345 / Spur 366 in Dallas; southern terminus
I-635 in Dallas, at the High Five Interchange
Pres. George Bush Turnpike in Richardson
Sam Rayburn Tollway in McKinney
US 380 in McKinney
US 82 in Sherman
US 69 in Denison. The highways travel concurrently to Atoka, Oklahoma.
Oklahoma
US 70 in Durant
US 270 east of Calvin. The highways travel concurrently to Horntown.
I-40 / US 62 northeast of Clearview. I-40/US 75 travels concurrently to Henryetta. US 62/US 75 travels concurrently to Okmulgee.
US 266 in Henryetta
I-44 in Tulsa
I-244 in Tulsa. The highways travel concurrently through Tulsa.
I-244 / I-444 / US 64 in Tulsa. I-444/US 64/US 75 travels concurrently through Tulsa.
I-244 / I-444 / US 412 in Tulsa
US 60 in Bartlesville. The highways travel concurrently through Bartlesville.
Kansas
US 166 north of Caney. The highways travel concurrently for approximately 2.7 miles (4.3 km).
US 160 west of Independence. The highways travel concurrently to Independence.
US 400 north-northeast of Sycamore. The highways travel concurrently to west-southwest of Neodesha.
US 54 in Yates Center
I-35 / US 50 south-southeast of Olivet
US 56 south-southeast of Carbondale
I-470 in Topeka. The highways travel concurrently through Topeka.
I-70 / I-470 / US 40 in Topeka. I-70/US 40/US 75 travels concurrently through Topeka.
US 24 in Topeka
US 36 west of Fairview
Nebraska
US 73 north of Dawson
US 136 in Auburn
US 34 east of Union. The highways travel concurrently to La Platte.
US 275 in Omaha
I-80 / I-480 in Omaha. I-480/US 75 travels concurrently through Omaha.
US 6 in Omaha. Access Ramps on 28th and 29th Street lead to the parallel one way streets on US-6.
I-680 in Omaha
US 30 in Blair. The highways travel concurrently through Blair.
US 77 in Winnebago. The highways travel concurrently to South Sioux City.
I-129 / US 20 / US 77 in South Sioux City. I-129/US 75 travels concurrently to Sioux City, Iowa. US 20|US 75 travels concurrently to east of Sioux City, Iowa.
Iowa
US 18 west of Hull. The highways travel concurrently to west-northwest of Hull.
Minnesota
I-90 in Luverne
US 14 in Lake Benton. The highways travel concurrently through Lake Benton.
US 212 south of Madison
US 12 in Ortonville
I-94 / US 52 in Moorhead
US 10 in Moorhead. The highways travel concurrently through Moorhead.
US 2 north-northwest of Crookston. The highways travel concurrently to north of Crookston.
MN 171 in St. Vincent. Exit to Canada via Interstate 29. The highway is a dead-end at Noyes.

== See also ==
=== Special routes ===
- U.S. Route 75 Alternate in northeast Oklahoma
- U.S. Route 75 Business in Sioux City, Iowa
- U.S. Route 75 Business in Le Mars, Iowa

=== Related routes ===
- U.S. Route 175
- U.S. Route 275

Browse numbered routes
| ← SH 74 | TX | → SH 75 |
| ← K-74 | KS | → K-76 |
| ← N-74 | NE | → I-76 |
| ← I-74 | IA | → Iowa 76 |
| ← MN 74 | MN | → MN 76 |
