= U.S. Route 75 in Texas =

Highway in Texas

U.S. Highway 75
- US 75 highlighted in red

Route information
- Maintained by TxDOT
- Length: 75.2 mi (121.0 km)
- Existed: 1927–present

Major junctions
- South end: I-345 / Spur 366 in Dallas
- I-635 in Dallas; Pres. George Bush Turnpike in Richardson; Sam Rayburn Tollway in McKinney; US 380 in McKinney; US 82 in Sherman; US 69 in Denison
- North end: US 69 / US 75 near Denison

Location
- Country: United States
- State: Texas
- Counties: Dallas, Collin, Grayson

Highway system
- United States Numbered Highway System; List; Special; Divided; Highways in Texas; Interstate; US; State; Former; Toll; Loops; Spurs; FM/RM; Park; Rec
| ← SH 74 | → SH 75 |

U.S. Highway 75 (US 75) is a part of the U.S. Highway System that travels from I-345 in Dallas, Texas northward to the Canadian border in Noyes, Minnesota. In the state of Texas it runs from I-345 in Dallas and heads north to the Oklahoma state line, a distance of about 75.3 miles (121.2 km).

== History ==
In the initial assignment of state highways in 1917, Dallas-Fort Worth and Houston were connected by a branch of State Highway 2 (SH 2, the Meridian Highway), which ran via Waco and Bryan and continued on to Galveston. The more direct route followed by US 75 was not initially part of the system between Richland (connected to Dallas by SH 14) and Huntsville (connected to Houston by SH 19). This Richland–Huntsville cutoff was added by 1919 as SH 32, and US 75 was assigned to the alignment, as well as SH 6 north of Dallas, in 1926. The branch of SH 2, which US 75 followed between Houston and Galveston, eventually became part of SH 6, and these numbers were dropped in the 1939 renumbering.

Prior to the coming of the Interstate Highway System in the late 1950s, the only improvements to US 75 in Texas beyond building a two-lane paved roadway were in the Houston and Dallas areas. However, the highways in and near these cities included some of the first freeways in the state: the Gulf Freeway (Houston, opened to traffic on October 1, 1948) and the Central Expressway. When I-45 was built in the 1960s, its alignment bypassed many of the towns and built-up areas between Downtown Dallas and Houston. The bypassed routes retained the US 75 designation until the designation was truncated to Downtown Dallas in 1987. Many of the original alignments continue to exist under other designations.

In Dallas, the route followed what is now the Good Latimer Expressway (formerly Spur 559) southeast, out of downtown, along US 175 and south along SH 310.

Near Ferris, Trumbull, Palmer, Ennis, and Corsicana I-45 veers east to avoid the more populated areas. The old US 75 alignments through these towns, decommissioned in 1987, now carry the following designations:

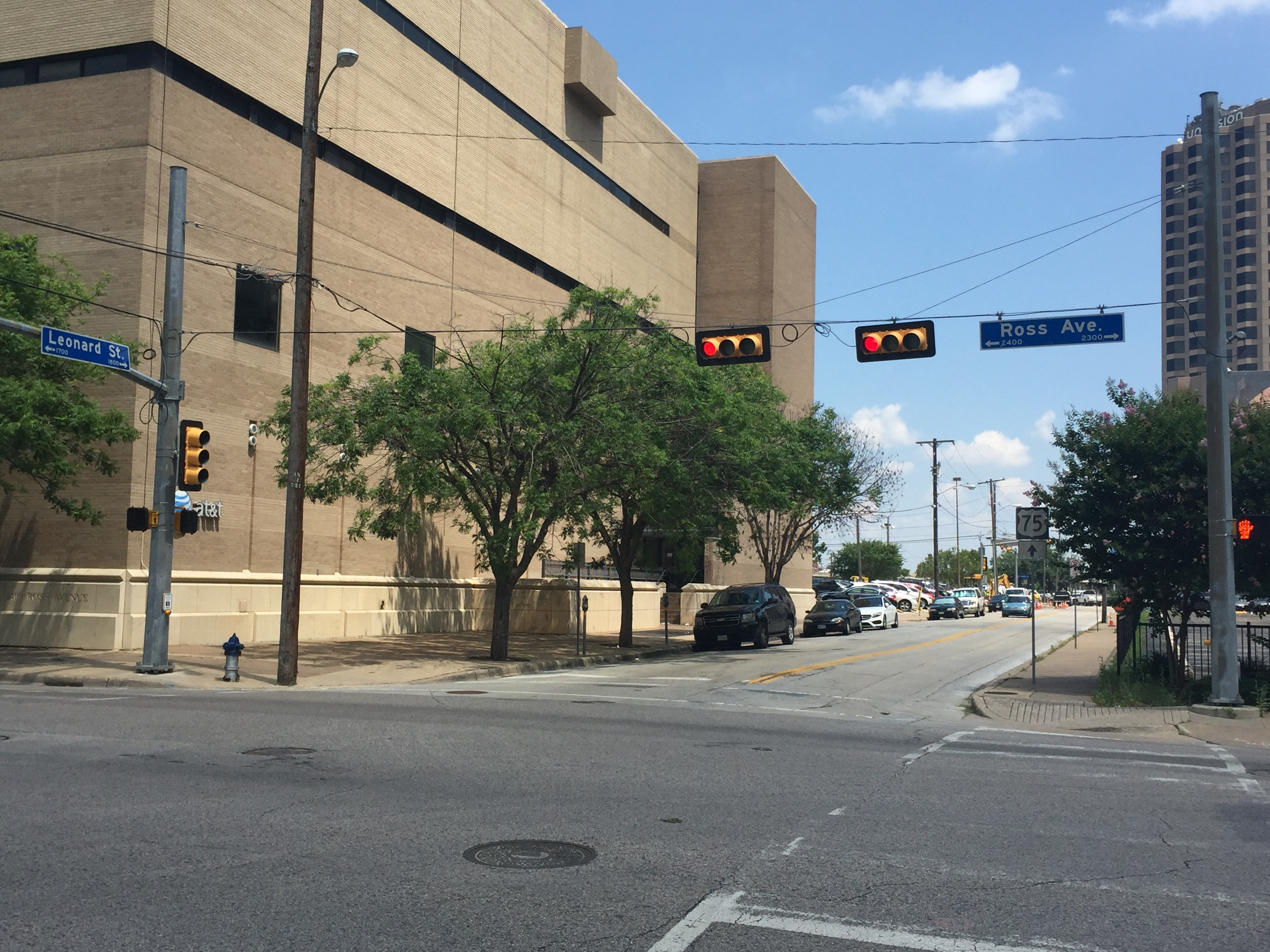
A 1960s-era sign for US 75 (centre right, in shade) in downtown Dallas. Taken at the corner of Ross Ave and Leonard St, facing southeast on Leonard St toward the now-decommissioned segment of US 75.

- I-45 Business-J (originally Loop 560) through Ferris
- Loop 561 through Trumbull
- I-45 Business-H through Palmer (originally Loop 562)
- Spur 469, I-45 Business-G (originally US 287 and Spur 563) through Ennis
- Interstate 45 Business-F (originally Loop 564) through Corsicana

Through Streetman, Fairfield, Buffalo, Centerville, Madisonville, Huntsville, New Waverly, Willis, and Conroe, US 75 followed what is now SH 75.

In Galveston, the alignment of SH 87 from 20th Street to the southern terminus of I-45 was also part of US 75 until its 1987 truncation.

In other cases alignments were bypassed while US 75 remained in existence; they now carry the following designations:

- SH 3 through La Marque, Dickinson, League City, South Houston and Houston, bypassed 1952
- SH 5 from north of Dallas via Plano, McKinney, Anna and Van Alstyne to Howe, bypassed 1959-1967
- SH 91 from Sherman to Denison, bypassed 1984

== Route description ==
US 75 begins at I-345, an unsigned auxiliary route of I-45 and heads north, first interchanging Spur 366 in the northeastern part of downtown Dallas. The highway then interchanges with SL 12 (Northwest Highway) before forming the High Five Interchange with I-635. Then, it interchanges with the President George Bush Turnpike as it continues north through Plano. It then interchanges with the Sam Rayburn Tollway, becoming concurrent with SH 121 and then heads through McKinney and interchanging with US 380. US 75 then splits from SH 121 in Melissa and continues north. In Sherman, the route crosses over SH 56 and then US 82. North of Denison, it becomes concurrent with US 69 for the next 2 miles (3.2 km) before crossing over the Red River and into Oklahoma.

The exit numbers for US 75 are not based on mile markers; instead, the exits were numbered consecutively (the only remaining stretch of road in Texas with such a system). As the bypass route was completed around the Sherman–Denison area, the numbering system was continued for the new exits. Upon completion of the widened Central Expressway through Dallas, the exit numbering was changed for the section south of I-635 to correspond with the new (and fewer number of) exits, based on mileage, but the numbering system north of I-635 was left unchanged, thus explaining the gap in the current numbering system.

== Exit list ==
| County | Location | mi | km | Old exit | New exit | Destinations | Notes |
|---|---|---|---|---|---|---|---|
| Dallas | Dallas | 0.0 | 0.0 | | | To I-45 south – Houston | Southern terminus; access via I-345 |
| Dallas | Dallas | 0.0 | 0.0 | | 286A (NB); 1A (SB) | To I-35E – Waco, Denton | Access via Spur 366 (Woodall Rodgers Freeway) |
| Dallas | Dallas | 0.2 | 0.32 | 1–2 | 1A | Hall Street, Lemmon Avenue | Northbound exit and entrance |
| Dallas | Dallas | 0.7 | 1.1 | 2–4 | 1B | Haskell Avenue/Blackburn Street, Lemmon Avenue, Fitzhugh Avenue | |
| Dallas | Dallas | 1.6 | 2.6 | 4–6 | 2 | Knox Street/Henderson Avenue, Fitzhugh Avenue, Monticello Avenue | |
| Dallas | Dallas | 3.0 | 4.8 | 6–10 | 3 | Mockingbird Lane, Monticello Avenue, SMU Boulevard | Access to SMU/Mockingbird station |
| Dallas | Dallas | 4.1 | 6.6 | 10–12 | 4A | Lovers Lane, SMU Boulevard, Southwestern Boulevard | |
| Dallas | Dallas | 4.8 | 7.7 | 13 | 4B | Caruth Haven Lane | No direct southbound exit (signed at exit 5A) |
| Dallas | Dallas | 5.0 | 8.0 | 14–15 | 5A | Loop 12 (Northwest Highway) | |
| Dallas | Dallas | 5.2 | 8.4 | 16 | 5B | NorthPark Boulevard, Park Lane | Access to Park Lane station |
| Dallas | Dallas | 6.1 | 9.8 | 17–18 | 6 | Walnut Hill Lane, Meadow Road | Access to Walnut Hill station, Presbyterian Hospital of Dallas, and Walnut Hill Medical Center |
| Dallas | Dallas | 7.3 | 11.7 | 18–19 | 7 | Royal Lane, Meadow Road | |
| Dallas | Dallas | 8.1 | 13.0 | 20A | 8A | Forest Lane | No direct southbound exit (signed at exit 20); access to Forest Lane station, Forest Park Medical Center–Dallas, and Medical City Dallas Hospital |
| Dallas | Dallas | 8.3 | 13.4 | 20B | 8B | Coit Road | Northbound exit and southbound entrance |
| Dallas | Dallas | 8.7 | 14.0 | | 20 | Churchill Way | Signed as exit 20B northbound |
| Dallas | Dallas | 9.0 | 14.5 | | 21 | I-635 | High Five Interchange; exit 19A on I-635 |
| Dallas | Dallas | | | | | I-635 Express west | Tolled; southern terminus of managed HOV lanes; southbound exit and northbound entrance |
| Dallas | Dallas | | | | ♦ | US 75 south / I-635 | Managed HOV lanes access only; southbound exit and northbound entrance |
| Dallas | Dallas | 10.4 | 16.7 | | 22A | Frontage Road | Southbound exit and northbound entrance |
| Dallas | Dallas | 9.6 | 15.4 | | 22 | Midpark Road | |
| Dallas | Richardson | 10.5 | 16.9 | | 23 | Spring Valley Road | Access to Spring Valley station |
| Dallas | Richardson | 11.2 | 18.0 | | 24 | Belt Line Road/Main Street | |
| Dallas | Richardson | 12.1 | 19.5 | | 25 | Arapaho Road, Collins Boulevard | Access to Arapaho Center station |
| Dallas | Richardson | 12.9 | 20.8 | | 26 | Campbell Road, Collins Boulevard, Galatyn Parkway | |
| Collin | Richardson | 14.1 | 22.7 | | 27 | Renner Road, Galatyn Parkway | Signed as exit 27A northbound; access to Galatyn Park station |
| Collin | Richardson–Plano line | 15.4 | 24.8 | | 28A | Plano Parkway, 15th Street | Access to CityLine/Bush station; 15th Street is former FM 544 |
| Collin | Richardson–Plano line | 15.7 | 25.3 | | 28B | Pres. George Bush Turnpike | Northbound entrance includes direct exit ramp onto 15th Street (exit 29) |
| Collin | Plano | 16.5 | 26.6 | | 29 | Park Boulevard, 15th Street | No northbound exit; access to Medical Center of Plano; 15th Street is former FM 544 |
| Collin | Plano | 17.6 | 28.3 | | 30 | Parker Road | Access to Parker Road station |
| Collin | Plano | 18.8 | 30.3 | | 31 | Spring Creek Parkway | Southbound access via exit 32 |
| Collin | Plano | 20.1 | 32.3 | | 32 | Legacy Drive | |
| Collin | Allen | | | | ♦ | Managed HOV lanes | Northern terminus of Managed HOV lanes; southbound exit and northbound entrance |
| Collin | Allen | 21.5 | 34.6 | | 32A | Frontage Road | Southbound exit only |
| Collin | Allen | 22.1 | 35.6 | | 33 | Bethany Drive | |
| Collin | Allen | 22.5 | 36.2 | | 34 | McDermott Drive | Former FM 2170 |
| Collin | Allen | 23.6 | 38.0 | | 35 | Allen Drive | Southbound access via exit 36 |
| Collin | Allen | 23.9 | 38.5 | | 36 | Exchange Parkway | Access to Texas Health Presbyterian Hospital Allen |
| Collin | Fairview–Allen line | 24.4 | 39.3 | | 37 | Stacy Road | Former FM 2786 east; FM 2786 is still signed on the exit sign |
| Collin | Fairview–Allen line | 26.5 | 42.6 | | 38A | Ridgeview Drive | |
| Collin | Fairview–Allen line | 26.6 | 42.8 | | 38B | Frontage Road | Northbound exit only; access to Medical Center of McKinney |
| Collin | Fairview–Allen– McKinney city tripoint | 26.8 | 43.1 | | 38C | Sam Rayburn Tollway south To SH 5 | No direct access from US 75 south to Spur 399/SH 5 |
| Collin | Fairview–Allen– McKinney city tripoint | 27.6 | 44.4 | | 39A | SH 121 south / Eldorado Parkway – Airport | Southern end of the concurrency with SH 121; access to Medical Center of McKinney |
| Collin | McKinney | 28.7 | 46.2 | | 39B | Frontage Road | Southbound exit only |
| Collin | McKinney | 28.9 | 46.5 | | 40A | Louisiana Street/Virginia Parkway | Former FM 3038 west; former Spur 359 east |
| Collin | McKinney | 30.4 | 48.9 | | 40B | White Avenue | No direct southbound exit |
| Collin | McKinney | 31.2 | 50.2 | | 41 | US 380 – Greenville, Denton | Access to Baylor Scott & White Medical Center McKinney |
| Collin | McKinney | 31.7 | 51.0 | | 42 | Wilmeth Road | Signed as exit 42A northbound and exit 42B southbound |
| Collin | McKinney | 32.7 | 52.6 | | 42 | Bloomdale Road | Signed as exit 42B northbound and exit 42A southbound |
| Collin | McKinney | 33.4 | 53.8 | | 43 | FM 543 / Laud Howell Parkway | |
| Collin | Melissa | 35.4 | 57.0 | 45 | 44-45 | SH 121 north – Bonham | Northern end of the concurrency with SH 121; northbound exit and southbound entrance; exit 44 northbound and exit 45 southbound |
| Collin | Melissa | 35.7 | 57.5 | 44 | 45 | SH 121 north / Bucees Boulevard – Bonham | Bucees Boulevard not signed southbound; SH 121 access southbound only |
| Collin | Melissa | 36.3 | 58.4 | | 46 | Melissa Road | |
| Collin | Melissa | 38.4 | 61.8 | | 47A | Throckmorton Road | |
| Collin | Anna | 39.0 | 62.8 | | 47B | Collin County Outer Loop | |
| Collin | Anna | 40.9 | 65.8 | | 48A | FM 455 (White Street) | |
| Collin | Anna | 41.5 | 66.8 | | 48B | Rosamond Parkway | |
| Collin | Anna | 43.8 | 70.5 | | 49 | Mantua Road | |
| Collin–Grayson county line | Van Alstyne | 45.0 | 72.4 | | 50 | Panther Parkway | |
| Grayson | Van Alstyne | 46.2 | 74.4 | | 51 | FM 121 (Van Alstyne Parkway) | Due to confusion between this road and SH 121 to the south, southbound signs are marked "DFW Traffic Use Exit 38C" |
| Grayson | Van Alstyne–Howe city line | 49.7 | 80.0 | | 52 | Blythe Road/West Farmington Road | |
| Grayson | Howe | 51.9 | 83.5 | | 53 | Spur 381 (Haning Street) | |
| Grayson | Howe | 54.3 | 87.4 | | 54 | SH 5 south / FM 902 | |
| Grayson | Sherman | 55.8 | 89.8 | | 54A | Shepherd Drive | |
| Grayson | Sherman | 57.4 | 92.4 | | 55 | Frontage Road | |
| Grayson | Sherman | 59.1 | 95.1 | 56 | 57 | FM 1417 / South Travis Street, Park Avenue | |
| Grayson | Sherman | 59.6 | 95.9 | | 56A | South Travis Street | Former northbound exit and southbound entrance |
| Grayson | Sherman | 59.9 | 96.4 | | 56B | Frontage Road | Former northbound exit only |
| Grayson | Sherman | 60.5 | 97.4 | 57 | 58 | Park Avenue, Center Street | |
| Grayson | Sherman | 61.9 | 99.6 | 58 | 59 | SH 56 (Lamar Street, Houston Street) / Washington Street | |
| Grayson | Sherman | 62.3 | 100.3 | | 59 | Washington Street | |
| Grayson | Sherman | 62.9 | 101.2 | | 60 | FM 131 north (North Travis Street) / Taylor Street | |
| Grayson | Sherman | 63.2 | 101.7 | | 61 | SH 91 north (Texoma Parkway) | No southbound exit |
| Grayson | Sherman | 63.9 | 102.8 | | 62 | Lamberth Road, Taylor Street | No northbound entrance |
| Grayson | Sherman | 64.3 | 103.5 | | 63 | US 82 – Bonham, Gainesville | Exit 642 on US 82 |
| Grayson | Sherman | 64.8 | 104.3 | | 64 | South Loy Lake Road, Fallon Drive | |
| Grayson | Sherman–Denison city line | 67.2 | 108.1 | | 65 | FM 691 – Grayson College, Airport | Access to Texoma Medical Center |
| Grayson | Denison | 68.3 | 109.9 | | 66 | Spur 503 east – Denison | Spur 503 exit 596 to US 75 northbound |
| Grayson | Denison | 68.8 | 110.7 | | 67 | North Loy Lake Road | |
| Grayson | Denison | 70.1 | 112.8 | | 68 | Crawford Street | |
| Grayson | Denison | 71.0 | 114.3 | | 69 | FM 120 (Morton Street) | |
| Grayson | Denison | 72.2 | 116.2 | | 70 | FM 84 | |
| Grayson | Denison | 73.3 | 118.0 | | 71 | Randell Lake Road | |
| Grayson | Denison | 74.3 | 119.6 | | 72 | SH 91 | |
| Grayson | Denison | 75.3 | 121.2 | | 73 | US 69 south – Denison, Greenville | Southern end of the concurrency with US 69 |
| Grayson | Denison | 76.1 | 122.5 | | 74 | Frontage Road | Southbound exit and entrance |
| Grayson | Denison | 77.2 | 124.2 | | 75 | Texas Travel Info Center | Southern end of the concurrency with northbound US 69; signed as exit 74 northbound |
| Grayson | Denison | 77.4 | 124.6 | | | US 69 north / US 75 north – Durant | Continuation into Oklahoma |
1.000 mi = 1.609 km; 1.000 km = 0.621 mi: Concurrency terminus; Electronic toll collection; Closed/former; HOV only; Incomplete access

== See also ==
U.S. Route 75
| Previous state: Terminus | Texas | Next state: Oklahoma |
