= Segmental bridge =

Structure meant to span obstacles, assembled one piece at a time

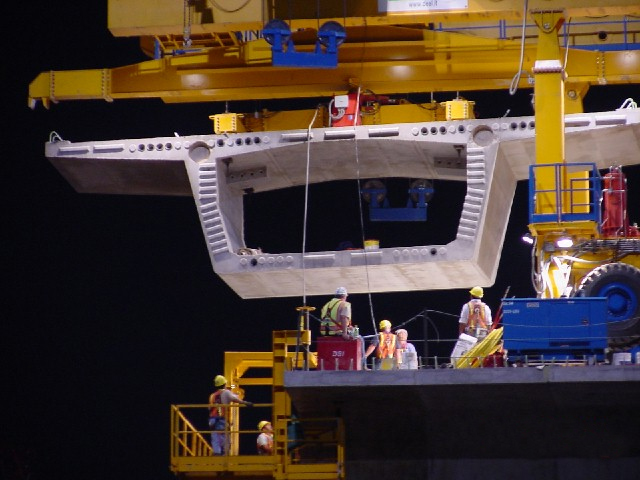
- A bridge segment, part of the High Five interchange, in Dallas, Texas.
- Span range: Long
- Material: Concrete
- Movable: No
- Design effort: High
- Falsework required: Yes

A segmental bridge is a bridge built in short sections (called segments), i.e., one piece at a time, as opposed to traditional methods that build a bridge in very large sections. The bridge is made of concrete that is either cast in place (constructed fully in its final location) or precast concrete (built at another location and then transported to their final location for placement in the full structure).

These bridges are very economical for long spans (more than 100 metres or 330 feet), especially when access to the construction site is restricted. They are also chosen for their aesthetic appeal.

== History ==
The first cantilevered segmental concrete bridge, built in 1930, was Ponte Emílio Baumgart across Rio do Peixe in the state of Santa Catarina of Brazil. It was followed in 1951 by the prestressed concrete bridge across the Lahn River in Balduinstein, Germany, the first of many cantilevered bridges designed by Ulrich Finsterwalder.

The first prestressed concrete bridge assembled from precast elements was the Pont de Luzancy across the river Marne in France, built according to the design by Eugène Freyssinet and commenced in 1940, but due to the war, completed only in 1946.

== Construction ==
The sequence of construction is similar to traditional concrete bridge building, i.e., build the support towers (columns), build the temporary falsework, build the deck, perform finish work. The principal differences are as follows:

1. The support towers may be built segmentally. Often this is accomplished using "slip-form" construction, where the falsework moves (slips) upward following sequential concrete "pours." The falsework uses the newly constructed concrete as the basis for moving upward.
2. After the towers are built, a superstructure is built atop the towers. This superstructure serves as the "launching" point for building the deck. (The deck is often built in both directions away from the tower, simultaneously.)
3. The deck is now constructed sequentially, beginning at the tower, one section at a time. This process is usually accomplished using a self propelled bridge layer that hoists the bridge section into place.
  - In cast-in-place bridges, the falsework is connected to the previously installed concrete and allowed to cantilever freely. Next, the permanent reinforcing steel and supports are installed. Finally, the concrete is placed and cured, freeing the falsework to be moved.
  - In pre-cast bridges, the concrete segment is constructed on the ground, and then transported and hoisted into place. As the new segment is suspended in place by the crane, workers install steel reinforcing that attaches the new segment to preceding segments. Each segment of the bridge is designed to accept connections from both preceding and succeeding segments.
4. The process in step 3 is repeated until the span is completed.

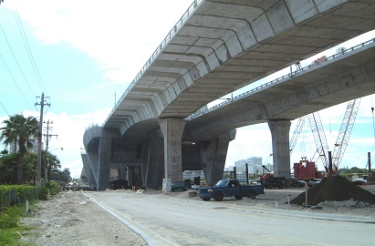
Segmental bridge under construction, Ft. Lauderdale, Florida, USA.

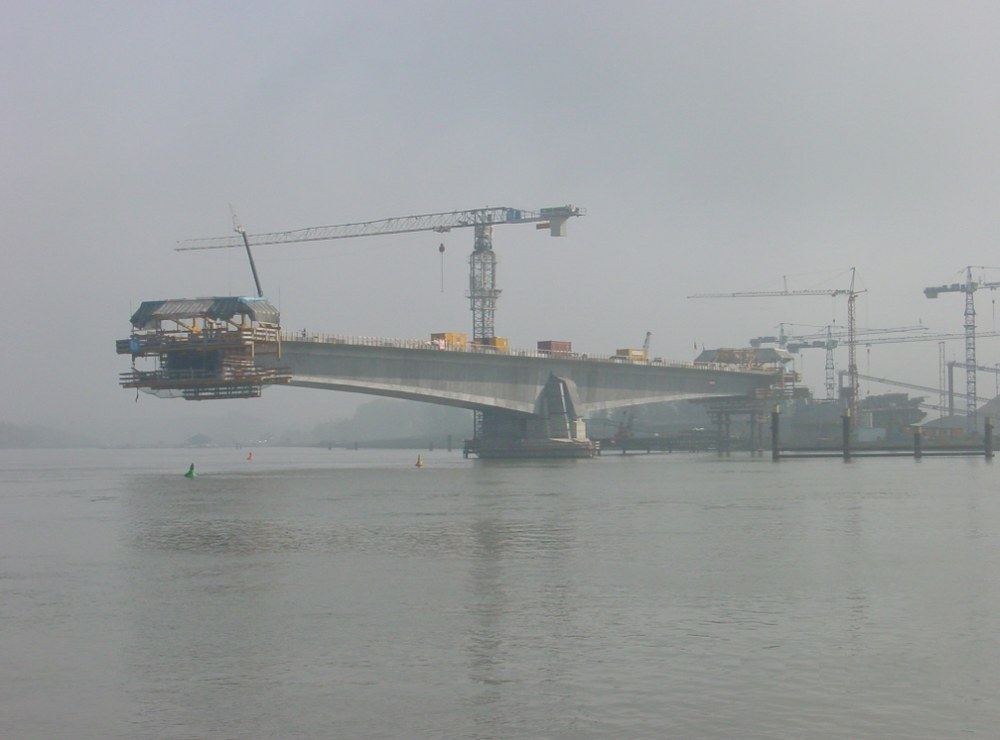
The Pierre Pflimlin bridge being built over the Rhine south of Strasbourg.

== Notable examples ==
- Senator William V. Roth Jr. Bridge in Delaware is a cable-stayed bridge using precast concrete segments for the approach and center spans
- Vancouver SkyTrain's Millennium Line as well as the elevated portion of the Canada Line
- Linn Cove Viaduct in the Blue Ridge Mountains, North Carolina (precast)
- Manwel Dimech Bridge in St. Julian's (San Ġiljan), Malta. This bridge connects the two parts of Regional Road and pass over Għomar Valley.
- Seven Mile Bridge in the Florida Keys (precast)
- The Interstate H-3 viaducts through the Ko'olau Mountains, Oahu, Hawaii (CIP Segmental)
- The new Pennsylvania Turnpike (I-76) bridges over the Susquehanna River south of Harrisburg, Pennsylvania (precast)
- The Eastern span replacement of the San Francisco-Oakland Bay Bridge viaduct (precast)
- The Benicia-Martinez Bridge (northbound span) between Benicia and Martinez, CA (CIP Segmental)
- The Four Bears Bridge over the Missouri River in North Dakota utilizes precast concrete segments, erected with the balanced cantilever method (precast)
- The High Five Interchange connecting US-75 and I-635 in Dallas, TX (precast)
- The AirTrain linking NY's John F. Kennedy International Airport with the Jamaica Transit Center
- The ramps leading between the Brooklyn Queens Expressway (NY I-278) and the Williamsburg Bridge (connecting to Manhattan)
- The elevated sections of the Delhi Metro
- The elevated sections of the Dubai Metro
- The I-35W Saint Anthony Falls Bridge in Minneapolis, MN, is notable primarily for the bridge it replaced: I-35W Mississippi River bridge which collapsed on August 1, 2007
- The Veterans' Glass City Skyway in Toledo, OH
- Canada's Confederation Bridge linking the provinces of Prince Edward Island and New Brunswick
- Bridge over River Kosi between Saharsa and Darbhanga in Bihar, India
- Zilwaukee Bridge crossing the Saginaw River on I-75 north of Saginaw in Zilwaukee, Michigan
- The Pitkins Curve bridge on California State Route 1 near Big Sur is a CIP segmental bridge bypassing a rock-slide portion of a scenic motorway
- Portions of the Interstate 4 – Selmon Expressway Connector in Tampa, Florida
- The Atal Setu bridge in Goa is a cable-stayed bridge which used the Segmental bridge construction from start to end crossing the Mandovi River
- The Cline Avenue Toll Bridge in East Chicago Indiana

== Related sites ==
- Federal Highway Administration
- https://www.asbi-assoc.org/
- https://www.figgbridge.com/
- http://www.finleyengineeringgroup.com/index.cfm/home
- http://www.mcnarybergeron.com/
- http://www.pbworld.com/news_events/publications/network/issue_57/57_03_murilloj_briefhistoryseg.asp
- http://www.pbworld.com/news_events/publications/network/issue_28/28_16_wahlp_constructionsequence.asp
- http://www.polito.it/creepanalysis
