= Medical City Dallas Hospital =

Medical City Dallas
- Hospital Corporation of America

Geography
- Location: 7777 Forest Lane, North Dallas, Texas, United States
- Coordinates: 32.91179°N 96.7734°W

Organization
- Care system: Private
- Type: District General

Services
- Emergency department: Level II Pediatric Trauma Center
- Beds: 876

History
- Opened: 1974

Links
- Website: www.medicalcityhealthcare.com/locations/medical-city-dallas-hospital
- Lists: Hospitals in Texas

Medical City Dallas is a hospital located at 7777 Forest Lane, just west of North Central Expressway (US 75), in north Dallas, Texas, United States. It is operated by Hospital Corporation of America.

== History ==
Medical City opened its doors after Dr. Frank Seay cut the ribbon that opened Medical City Dallas Hospital to the residents of the community on October 2, 1974. Developer Trammell Crow and his partners chose to locate the hospital and medical office tower on a 250-acre plot in the Park Central area of Dallas partly because preliminary research showed that as of 1972 when the development was planned, 85 percent of all MDs in Dallas County lived within a 15-minute drive of the new complex. Estimates of the cost at the announcement of the project on April 6, 1972, were that the complex would cost $20 million ($113 million in 2015 dollars). Surveys as of early 1972 showed that prior to the opening of the hospital, Dallas had six hospital beds per 1000 people, while eight cities of comparable size averaged just over 9.1 beds per 1000 people.

The 14-story, 367-bed hospital had 78 physicians on the medical staff and enough staff to care for an 85 percent occupancy rate. In describing the original plan, co-managing partner Robert J. Wright touted the updated 20th-century concept of combining hospital-related facilities on the same site with the hospital itself: "For too long, many doctors have had to practice 20th century medicine in 19th century facilities, with their offices at one location, their hospital at another, lab, X-ray and other vital services at still another, and all at great distances from each other and from their homes." Additional features of the design included separate entrances for patients and for doctors to facilitate doctors' ability to "from their entrance, go directly to ancillary services or make rounds in the hospital, and then proceed to their offices," as well as the location of doctors' offices nearest to the most relevant department for their specialties, such as locating the cardiologists' offices next to the ECG and stress laboratories."

A second phase of construction commenced in 1977 with the addition to the hospital called Medical City II, enabling the doubling of the physician-tenant population through a second patient tower and two physician office buildings east of the original hospital. The first office phase opened as the four-story Building B in 1979. The eastern eight-story second office phase, Building C, along with the seven-story patient tower north of CareTower A, opened in 1984.

The hospital complex served as home to Dallas' first Health Maintenance Organization (HMO), a set-fee medical program established through a joint HMO venture between the Kaiser Permanente Medical Care Program and Prudential Insurance Company of America. The initial facility for the HMO program cost $1 million when it opened in 1979.

In 1982, a 3-alarm fire originating in the linen room caused smoke to travel up a laundry chute and fill the top three floors. Although 70 patients were evacuated, there were no injuries reported, and the facility faced only $50,000 in damage thanks to the fire ceasing within approximately 15 minutes.

By the early 1990s, construction of additional expansions was underway, culminating in a fourth building and second patient tower, CareTower D, also opening with seven stories north of CareTower A in 1995. Another expansion transpired ten years later, when a third, six-story patient tower, CareTower E, opened alongside the hospital's current emergency room and two additional floors of CareTower A's North Tower.

As the 2010s began, Medical City expanded CareTower A again in order to establish a new building for the Medical City Children's Hospital on the site of the hospital's previous emergency room facility. Between 2014 and 2018, the hospital added additional floors to CareTowers E and D successively, bringing them to thirteen floors, the same height as the original CareTower A South Tower.

On October 2, 2024, the hospital celebrated its fiftieth anniversary through the opening of a time capsule in the lobby of the main hospital atrium and the erection of five sequential banners outlining and illustrating the hospital's history.

== Funding and ownership ==
All entities in the facility, including the hospital, physician offices, retail areas, and service centers, are tenants of the Limited Partnership that launched at Medical City's inception. The initial construction was to be paid completely from private capital as opposed to public donations or tax monies. This funding source became somewhat controversial in the early 1980s when MCD joined twelve other private hospitals in north Texas requesting to participate in a tax-exempt bond program "to finance the purchase of X-ray equipment, surgical tools and other medical equipment"; administrators in public hospitals in other cities objected to participation by private hospitals "that care for few or no charity patients" and the U.S. Treasury Department opposed use of such programs to finance private ventures, estimating that such programs "cost the government $100 million to $300 million in lost tax revenue annually."
