= APWA =

APWA as an acronym may refer to:

- All Pakistan Women's Association
- American Public Works Association
