= High Five Interchange =

Interchange in Dallas, Texas, U.S.

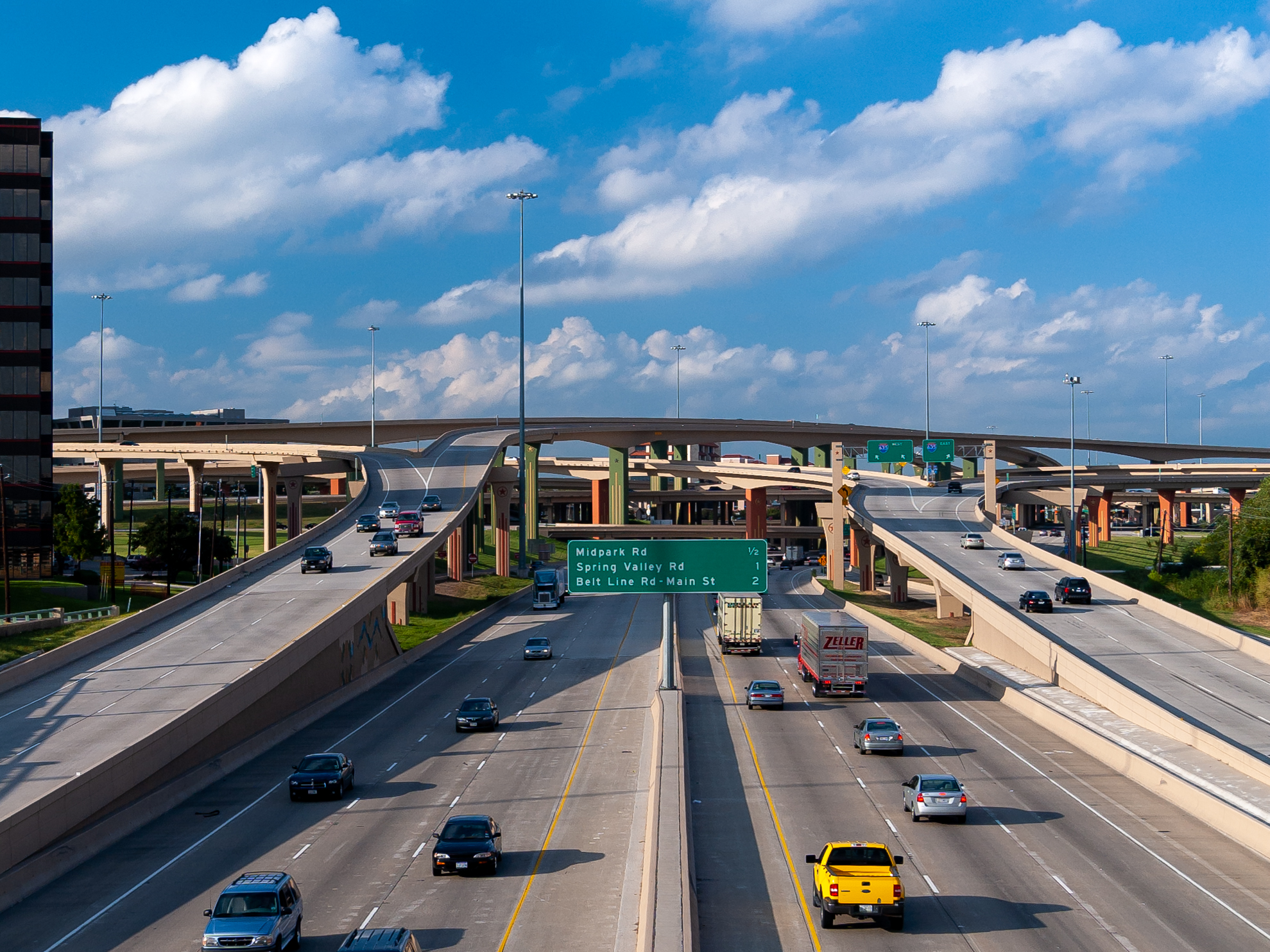
- Interactive map of High Five Interchange

Location
- Dallas, Texas, US
- Coordinates: 32°55′27″N 96°45′49″W
- Roads at junction: US 75 (Central Expressway); I-635 (LBJ Freeway)

Construction
- Type: Five-level stack interchange
- Constructed: 2002–2005 by Zachry Construction Corporation
- Opened: December 2005
- Maximum height: 117 ft (36 m)
- Maintained by: Texas Department of Transportation

The High Five Interchange is one of the first five-level stack interchanges built in Dallas, Texas, United States. Located at the junction of the Lyndon B. Johnson Freeway (Interstate 635, or I-635) and the Central Expressway (U.S. Highway 75, or US 75), it replaces an antiquated combination interchange constructed in the 1960s.

The $261 million (equivalent to $446 million in 2025) project was started in 2002 and completed in December 2005; 13 months ahead of schedule. It was designed by HNTB and built by Zachry Construction Corporation.

The interchange is considered by Popular Mechanics to be one of "The World's 18 Strangest Roadways" because of its height (as high as a 12-story building), its 43 permanent bridges, and other unusual design and construction features. In 2006, the American Public Works Association (APWA) named the High Five Interchange as "Public Works Project of the Year".

== Description ==
The High Five Interchange, north of downtown in Dallas, Texas, is a massive five-level freeway interchange. It is the junction of two major highways carrying heavy rush-hour traffic, the Lyndon B. Johnson Freeway (I-635) and the Central Expressway (US 75), and is the first five-level stack interchange to be built in the city.

It replaces the antiquated three-level modified cloverleaf interchange built in the 1960s, which caused a severe bottleneck by narrowing US 75 down to two lanes at the junction of the two highways. The looped ramps of the cloverleaf forced motorists to slow down drastically, backing up traffic. Left-hand exits contributed to the congestion. Further, its two frontage roads were not directly connected to each other, making local access difficult.

Alluding to the celebratory gesture, the "High Five" name refers to the five flyover ramps that tower over the landscape, handling the left-turn movements. The interchange is as high as a 12-story building and includes 43 bridges spread across five levels (the "High Five"), 710 support tiers, and 60 miles (97 km) of additional highway lanes. The highest ramps are 100 feet (30 m) above ground. The lanes of US 75, which are on the bottom level, are 20 feet (6.1 m) below ground level, giving the structure a total height of 117 feet (36 m) from bottom to top. As part of the project, I-635 was widened to include four dedicated high-occupancy vehicle lanes (HOV lanes) that are barrier-separated and reversible.

The new lanes for regular traffic were built on the outer vacant right-of-way, while the HOV lanes were built in the median. The original I-635 lanes that passed through the former interchange, now demolished, were relocated between the new regular and HOV lanes.

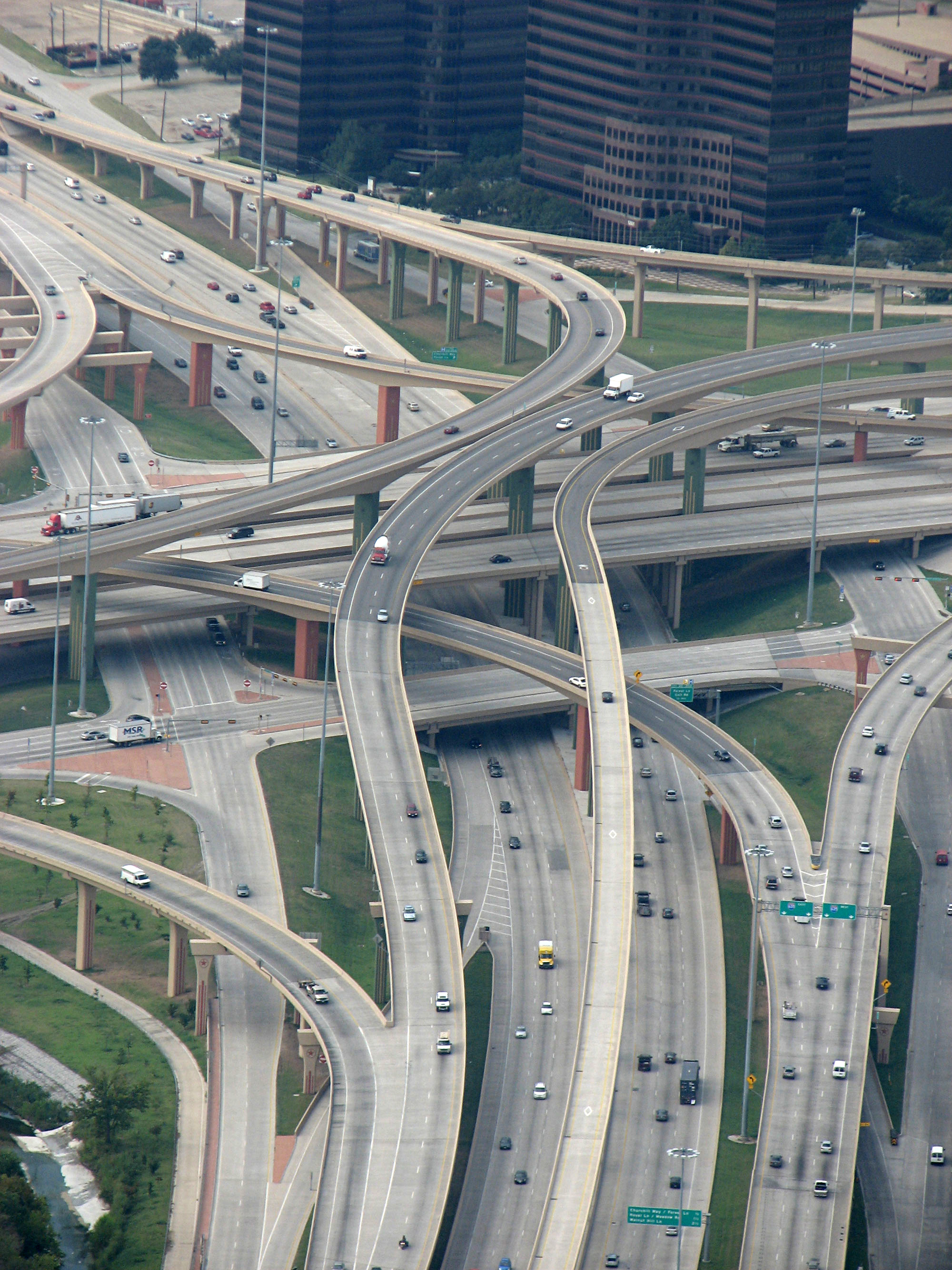
High Five Interchange: US 75 on the bottom level; the two frontage roads on the second; I-635 on the third; and direct connection ramps on the two top levels

From bottom to top, the roads on the five levels are:

- Level I: US 75, a six-lane highway, three lanes going each way
- Level II: The junction of the two six-lane frontage roads, each having three through lanes in each direction, left-turn lanes, and turnarounds, and easy access to US 75 and I-635
- Level III: I-635, 10 regular lanes, five going each way, and four HOV lanes (two going each way) separated by barriers
- Levels IV and V: Direct connection ramps (two levels), eliminating the left exits of the modified cloverleaf

The interchange is decorated with etchings on precast concrete elements, along with coloration specified by the Texas Department of Transportation (TxDOT). The High Five Interchange also incorporates a hiking and bike trail, named the Cottonwood Trail, which runs under all levels of the interchange. The section of the trail passing beneath the interchange was constructed as part of the High Five Interchange project by TxDOT.

== History ==
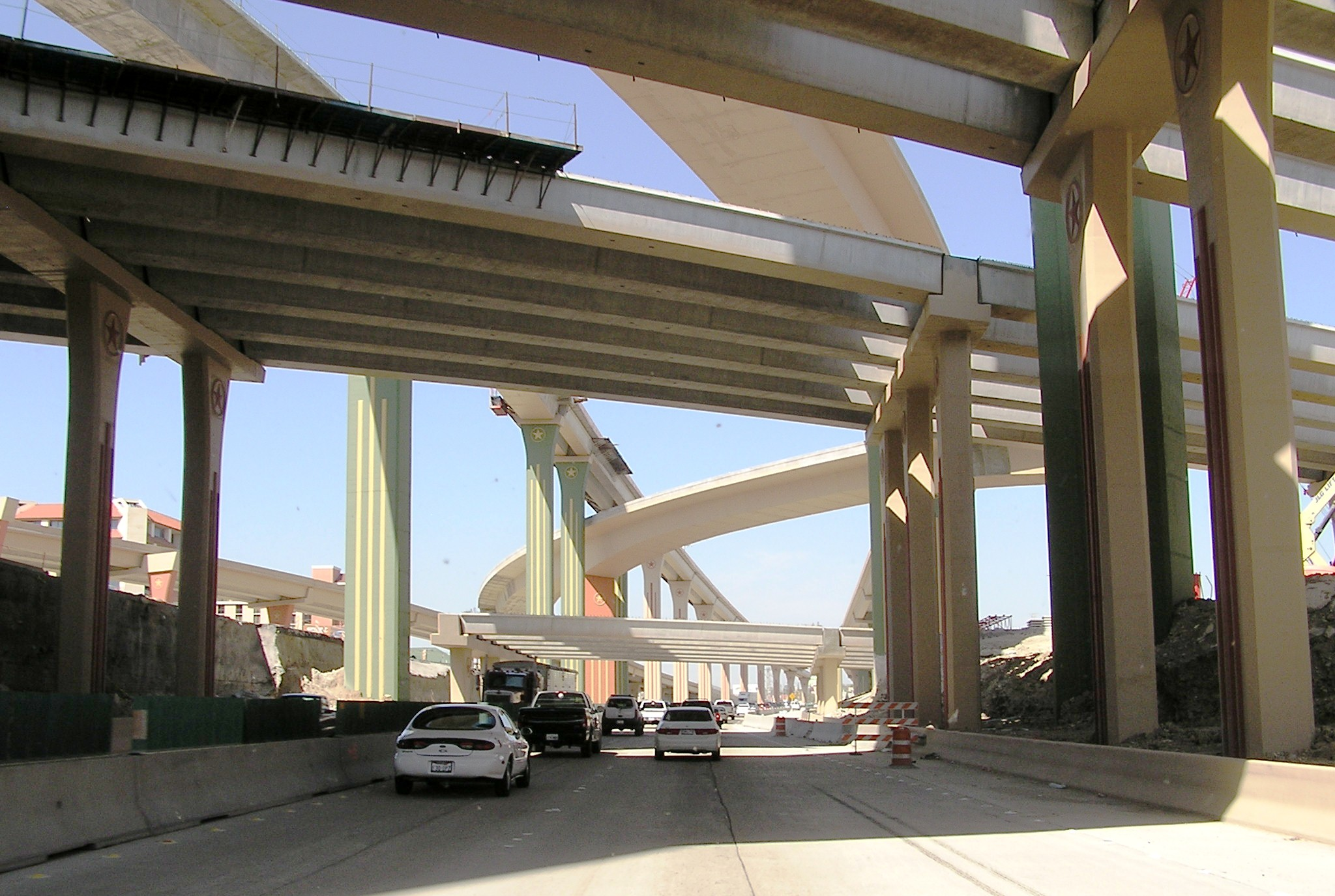
High Five Interchange under construction in 2005

The High Five Interchange project was planned as a replacement for the existing antiquated interchange, which accommodated 500,000 vehicles daily and was located in one of the most intensely developed commercial zones in Dallas. It was a collaborative project between the TxDOT, affected motorists and property owners, and the primary contractor, Zachry Construction. An essential consideration was to complete the project with as little disruption to the traffic flow as possible.

Reasons for upgrading the interchange, in addition to the need to increase traffic flow and reduce congestion, were to improve air quality, safety, and local access.

Zachry Construction Corporation submitted the lowest bid and was awarded the $261 million (equivalent to $446 million in 2025) contract by TxDOT, the largest ever by that agency. The construction contract for the interchange was unique in that it contained elements not found in other construction project contracts. For example, it specified the concrete maturity method to be used to ensure the concrete's strength (the first time TxDOT had ever done so) and contained an early-completion bonus, a sliding scale of up to $11 million (equivalent to $18.8 million in 2025) if the company completed the contract within four years. Also built into the construction contract was a provision that Zachry be charged for "lane rentals" by TxDOT for time they closed down a traffic lane, with fees based on hourly assessments and the time of day the lane was closed. The fees ranged from $50 to a high of $110,000 for rush hours (equivalent to $85 to $190,000 in 2025). In order not to interfere with traffic flow during construction, the new interchange was designed largely as elevated flyover ramps and viaducts so they could be built high over the existing junction lanes; once traffic was transferred to the new structures, the old lanes could simply be closed off and removed. Little of the original interchange remained when the project was finished.

To save time and money, innovative construction methods were employed. The original plans called for the segments of the long ramps and spans (used to direct-connect roads) to be made of steel, but, because building with steel would interfere with heavy traffic flow during construction, cast-in-place segmental concrete was substituted in the plans. Zachry decided, however, to use precast concrete segmental bridges, rather than casting the bridge elements in place, and used a unique machine, designed and constructed by Deal S.R.L. of Italy and costing about $1 million (equivalent to $1.71 million in 2025), to move the pieces into place.

During the construction, 2.2 million cubic yards (1.7×10^{6} m^{3}) of earthwork was used, 350,000 cubic yards (270,000 m^{3}) of concrete was mixed on site, and 300,000 cubic feet (8,500 m^{3}) of retaining walls were built. Additionally, 40,000 feet (12,000 m) of drilled shafts and 75,000 linear feet (23,000 m) of drainage pipe were completed. In addition to the construction of 43 permanent bridges, six temporary bridges were built, resulting in 2.3 million cubic feet (0.065×10^{6} m^{3}) of bridge deck.

The project was designed by HNTB, who provided professional engineering consultation throughout the construction, which had begun in 2002 and was completed in December 2005, more than 13 months earlier than planned.

== Recognition ==
In 2006, APWA named the High Five "Public Works Project of the Year" for its massive size, its innovative design, the complexity and rapidity of its construction, and the need it fulfilled for the community. TxDOT as the managing agency, Zachry Construction Corporation as the primary contractor, and HNTB as the primary consultant received the award in recognition of their cooperative alliance in completing the project.

The interchange is ranked by Popular Mechanics as one of "The World's 18 Strangest Roadways", which called it a "labyrinth of lanes" and a "five-level marvel of engineering" because of its height, the number of its bridges, and other unusual design and construction features.
