= Texas State Highway Spur 366 =

Highway in Texas

State Highway Spur 366
- Woodall Rodgers Freeway

Route information
- Maintained by TxDOT
- Length: 2.6 mi (4.2 km)
- Existed: 1962–present

Major junctions
- West end: Singleton Boulevard / Beckley Avenue in Dallas
- I-35E / US 77 in Dallas
- East end: I-345 / US 75 in Dallas

Location
- Country: United States
- State: Texas
- Counties: Dallas

Highway system
- Highways in Texas; Interstate; US; State; Former; Toll; Loops; Spurs; FM/RM; Park; Rec
← Loop 365	→ Loop 367

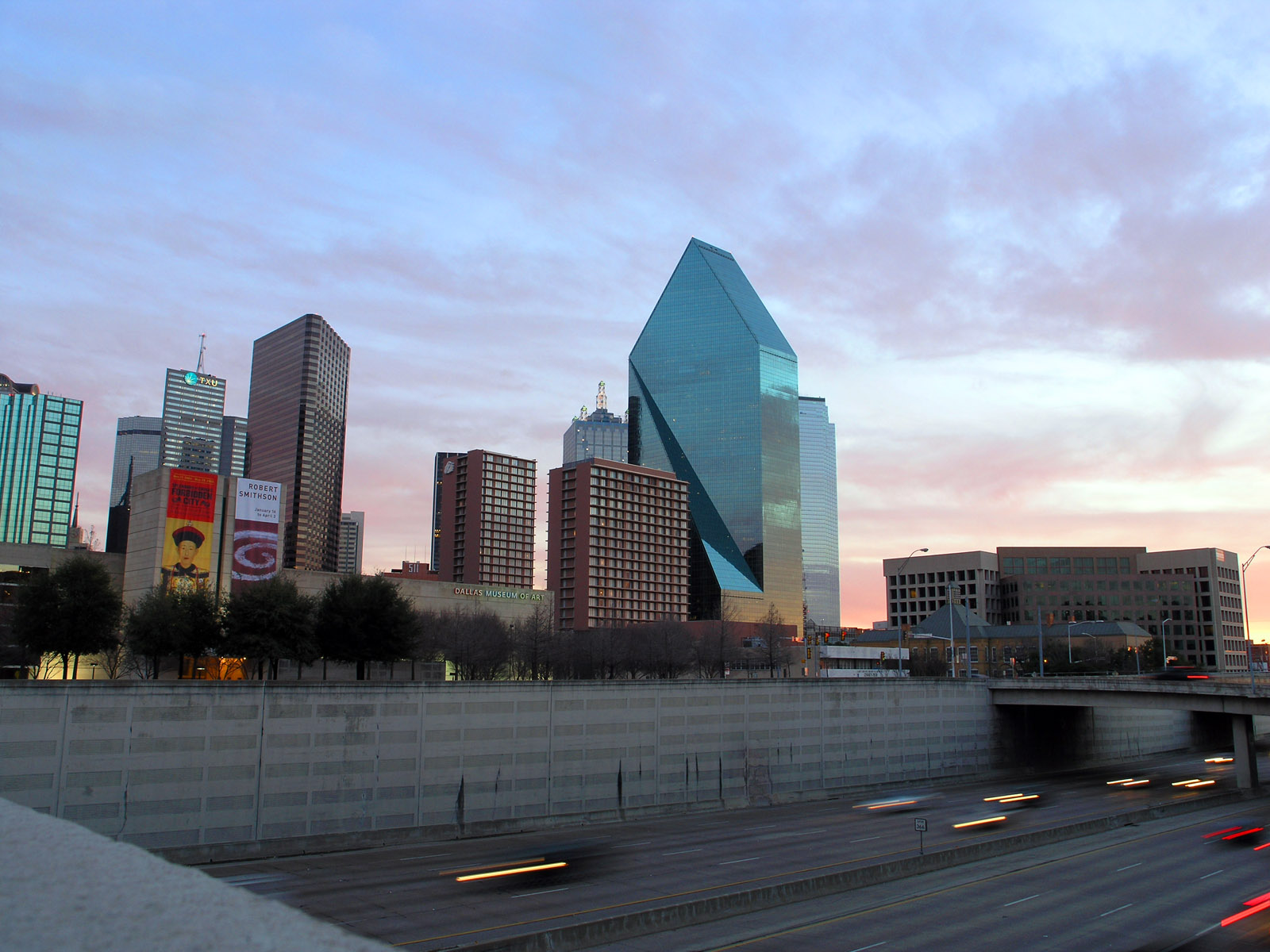
Facing southwest towards downtown from Harwood Street, with the angular Fountain Place in view (before the construction of Klyde Warren Park)

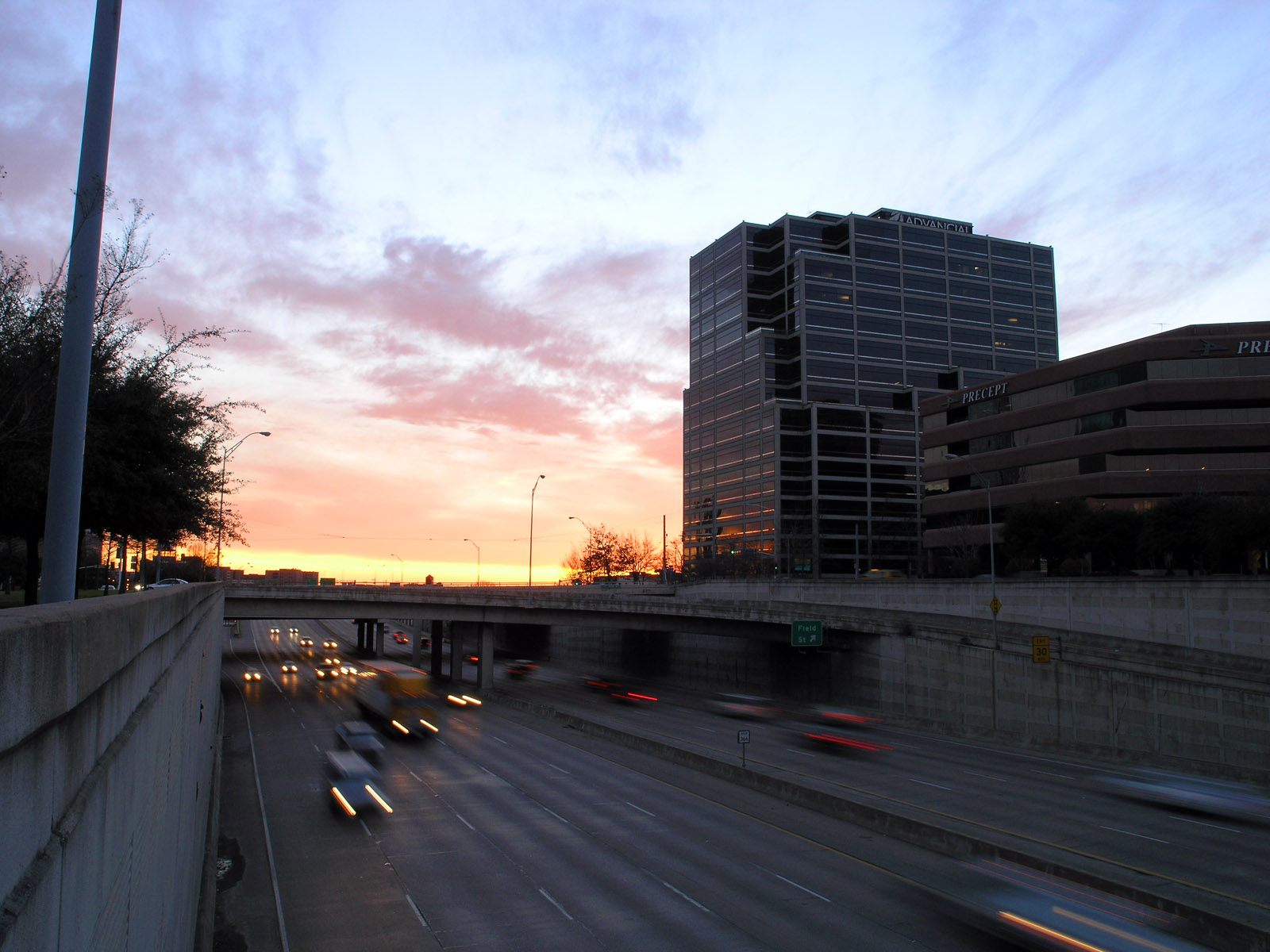
Facing west from Harwood Street towards buildings in the International Center neighborhood of Uptown (before the construction of Klyde Warren Park)

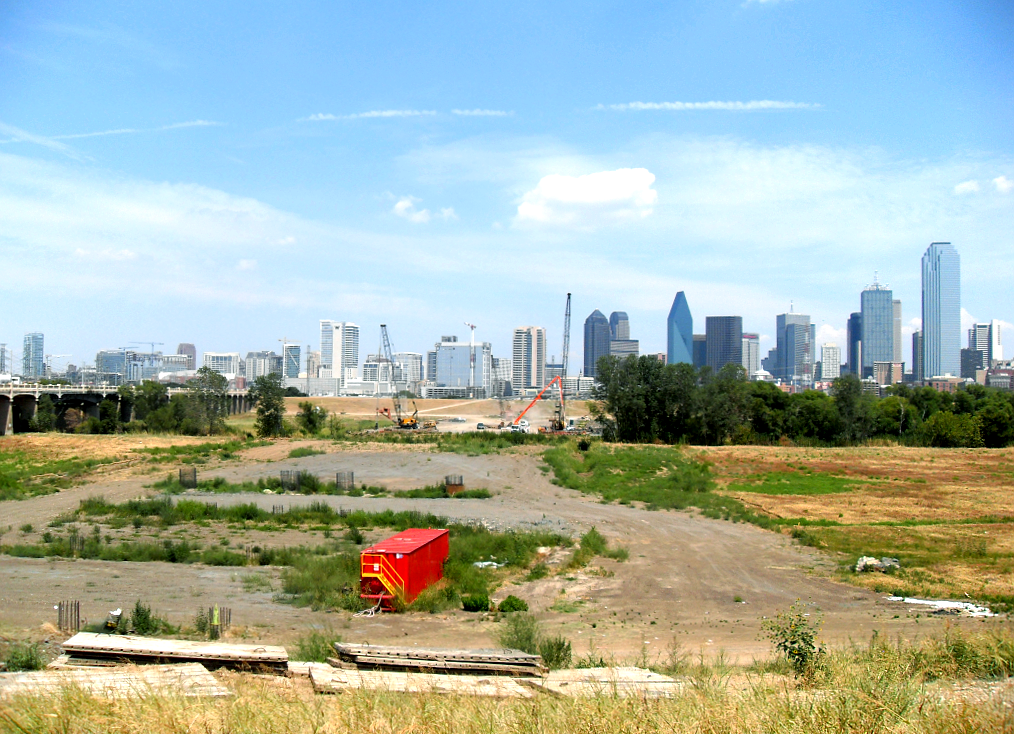
The beginning of work on the extension of Woodall Rodgers Freeway into West Dallas

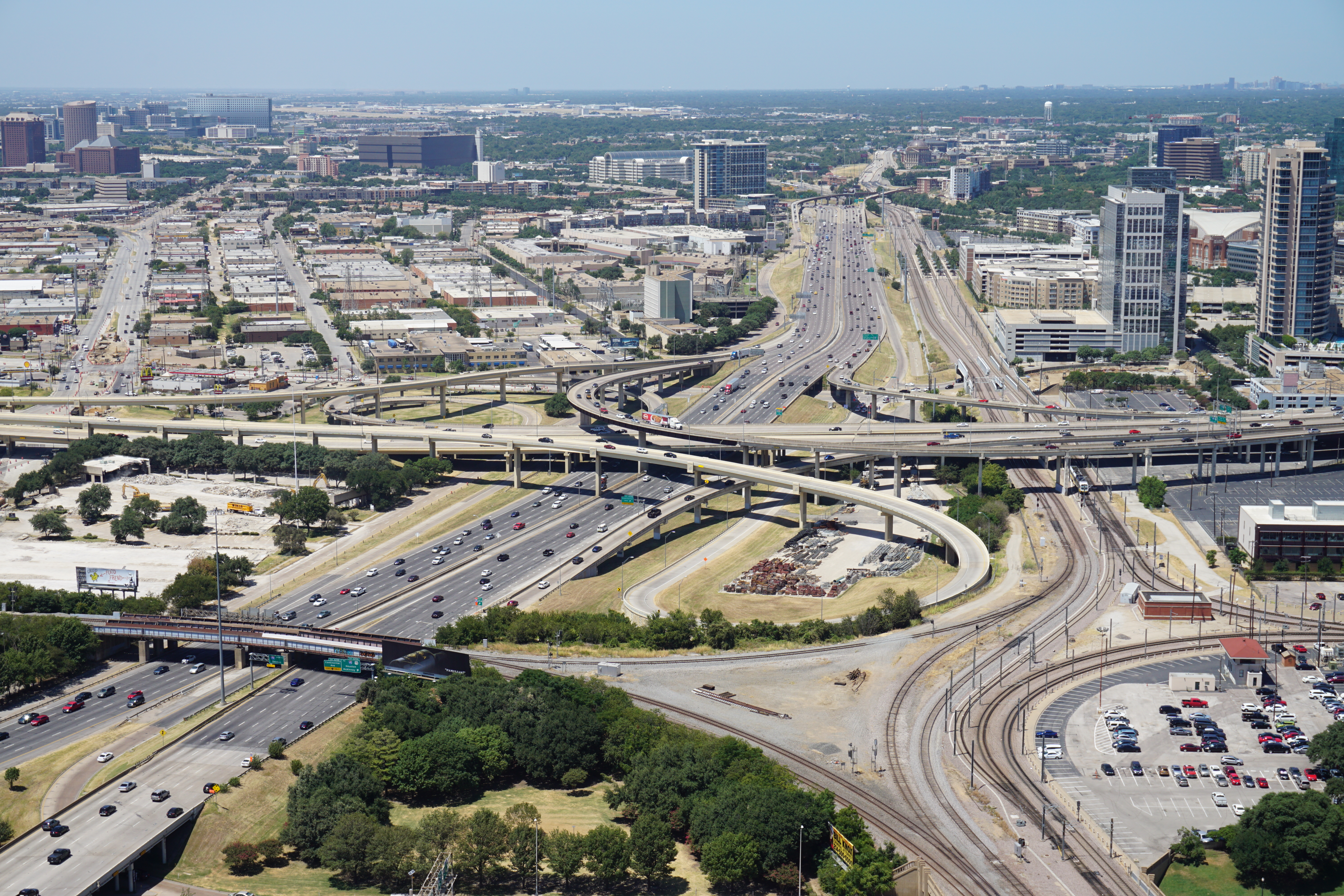
Spur 366 interchange with Interstate 35E

Spur 366, also named the Woodall Rodgers Freeway, is a freeway that connects Beckley Avenue and Singleton Boulevard in West Dallas to Interstate 35E, Interstate 345 and U.S. Route 75 (North Central Expressway) in central Dallas, Texas. The highway, as part of the downtown freeway loop, also serves as a dividing line between downtown Dallas on the south and the Uptown and Victory Park neighborhoods on the north. No hazmats are allowed in the downtown area.

In 2012, the Santiago Calatrava designed Margaret Hunt Hill Bridge was opened, extending Woodall Rodgers west of I-35E across the Trinity River, into West Dallas. The Margaret Hunt Hill Bridge is first of three planned bridges of the Trinity River Project.

Klyde Warren Park, completed in 2012, spans the freeway from Saint Paul Street to Pearl Street, connecting the downtown Arts District with Uptown. The freeway travels in a tunnel under the park.

The highway is named after Woodall Rodgers, a former mayor of Dallas responsible for the construction of Love Field and Central Expressway.

== Route description ==
Spur 366 is often referred to by most locals as Woodall Rodgers Freeway (or simply Woodall Rodgers). The only signage for Spur 366 is on the ramps to the highway at the interchanges with I-35E and I-345/US 75. As such, the highway is signed "TO I-35E" and "TO I-45/US-75," as I-345 is unsigned and connects to I-45.

The highway begins at a traffic signal at Beckley Avenue. Westbound traffic can continue past the light onto Singleton Boulevard. After the light, Spur 366 crosses the Trinity River on the Margaret Hunt Hill Bridge. From the bridge, traffic can exit to Riverfront Boulevard (formerly Industrial Boulevard). An incomplete interchange with I-35E (Stemmons Freeway) follows, before the freeway serves as the dividing line between Downtown and Uptown. There are many exits for the next mile, most of which contain multiple ramps to serve different streets. The freeway ends at an interchange with I-345/US 75 in northeast Downtown. The exit ramp to northbound US 75 also serves Hall Street.

=== Margaret Hunt Hill Bridge ===
The Margaret Hunt Hill Bridge is a steel bridge that carries Woodall Rodgers Freeway over the Trinity River. This is the first steel bridge across the river. The bridge opened in March 2012 and was designed by Santiago Calatrava.

=== Klyde Warren Park ===
Klyde Warren Park is a 5.4-acre park that connects Downtown Dallas with Uptown. The park is located above the freeway (which travels through a tunnel under the park, much like the Deck Park Tunnel in Phoenix) between Pearl and St. Paul streets to the west and east, and the frontage roads to the north and south.

== History ==
Like many freeways in the United States, Spur 366 was built through a prominent African-American neighborhood, displacing the population and gentrifying the area.

Spur 366 was built along sections of Cochran and Munger Streets between I-35E and I-345/US 75. Once the freeway opened in 1983, it remained relatively unchanged until the construction of the Margaret Hunt Hill Bridge and Klyde Warren Park in 2012.

== Exit list ==
The entire route is in Dallas, Dallas County.

mi	km	Exit	Destinations	Notes
0.00	0.00		Singleton Boulevard / Beckley Avenue	Western terminus
0.1– 0.2	0.16– 0.32	Margaret Hunt Hill Bridge over the Trinity River		
0.7– 1.0	1.1– 1.6	—	I-35E (US 77) – Denton, Waco	No eastbound access to I-35E south; exits 429A-B on I-35E
0.7– 1.0	1.1– 1.6	—	Riverfront Boulevard to I-35E south (US 77 south)	I-35E not signed westbound
1.3	2.1	—	Field Street / Griffin Street	Griffin Street not signed westbound
1.5	2.4	—	Saint Paul Street – Arts District	Westbound exit and entrance
1.3– 1.7	2.1– 2.7	Tunnel underneath Klyde Warren Park		
1.7	2.7	—	Pearl Street – American Airlines Center	
2.0	3.2	—	To I-45 south – Houston	Eastbound exit and westbound entrance; access via I-345; exit 286A on I-345
2.2	3.5	1	Hall Street / Lemmon Avenue	Eastbound exit and westbound entrance; exit no. corresponds to US 75
2.6	4.2		US 75 north – McKinney	Eastern terminus; exit 1A on US 75
1.000 mi = 1.609 km; 1.000 km = 0.621 mi: Incomplete access

== See also ==
- List of state highway spurs in Texas
