= Central Expressway (Dallas) =

Highway in Dallas, Texas

Route information
- Component highways: SH 310 / US 75

Major junctions
- South end: I-45 / SH 310 in Hutchins
- I-20 in Hutchins; US 175 in Dallas; SH 310 in Dallas; I-45 in Dallas; I-30 in Dallas; US 75 in Dallas; I-635 in Dallas; US 380 in McKinney
- North end: US 75 / County Line Road in Van Alstyne

Location
- Country: United States
- State: Texas

Highway system
- Highways in Texas; Interstate; US; State; Former; Toll; Loops; Spurs; FM/RM; Park; Rec

Central Expressway is a north–south highway in the Dallas-Fort Worth Metroplex in Texas (USA) and surrounding areas. The best-known section is the North Central Expressway, a name for a freeway section of U.S. Highway 75 between downtown Dallas and Van Alstyne, Texas. The southern terminus is south of the Woodall Rodgers Freeway at exit 284C of "hidden" Interstate 345 (signed as Interstate 45 southbound and US 75 northbound). From there, Central Expressway becomes the South Central Expressway, the northernmost portion of which was renamed César Chávez Boulevard on April 9, 2010.

== North Central Expressway ==
=== Route description ===
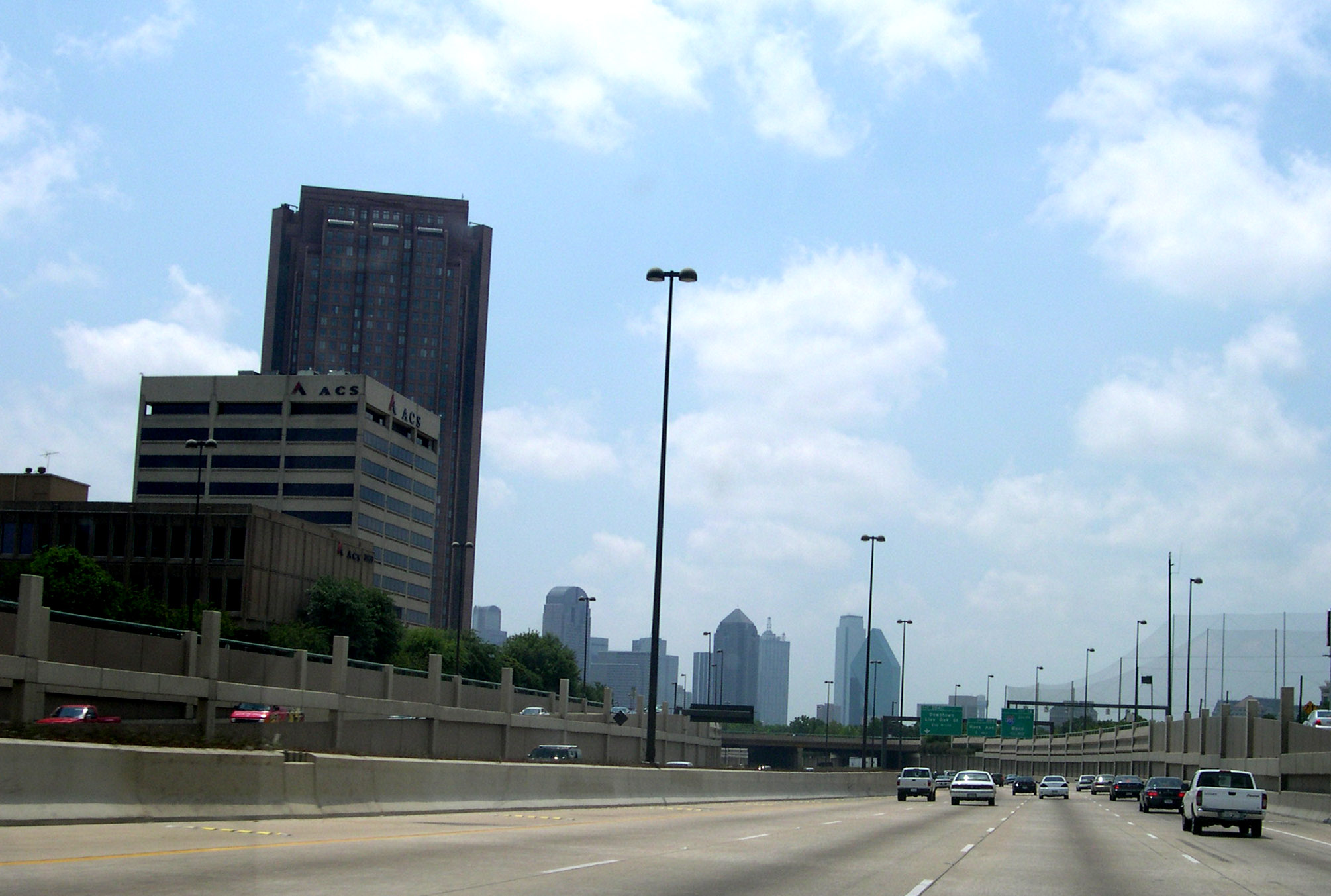
Central Expressway at Haskell Avenue

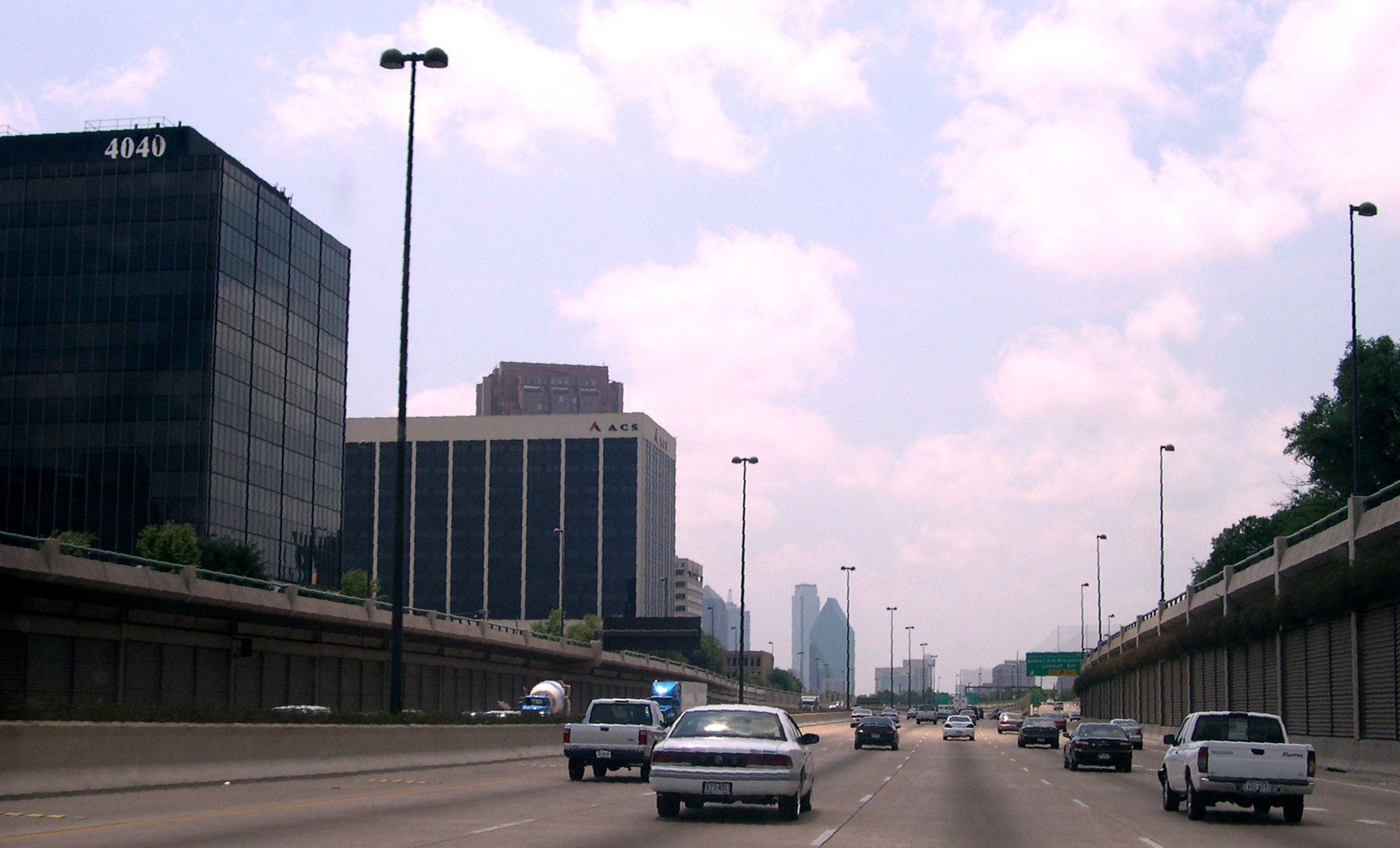
Central Expressway at Fitzhugh Avenue

The North Central Expressway extends from Woodall Rogers Freeway to County Line Road in Van Alstyne. For its entirety, the highway contains at least six frontage road lanes alongside the main lanes.

The road has at least eight continuous general-purpose lanes between Downtown Dallas and SH 121 north of McKinney, except for a six-lane segment where it passes under Interstate 635 (two additional lanes are present but are only entrance ramps/exit ramps for Forest Lane and Midpark Road). A 16-mile bi-directional HOV system, opened in 2007, extends from Interstate 635 to McDermott Road in Allen. The expressway's junction with Interstate 635 is a five-level stack interchange known as the High Five Interchange, the tallest in the world. For the next six miles (9.7 km) north of downtown Dallas, the freeway lies more than 30 feet (9.1 m) below adjacent and partially cantilevered frontage roads. This 14-lane segment is one of the busiest highways in the nation, averaging approximately 350,000 AADT in 2013.

The North Central Expressway is near high-income neighborhoods and enclave cities such as Highland Park and University Park. The freeway is also adjacent to popular districts including Uptown, Cityplace, Lower Greenville, NorthPark Center, and the Telecom Corridor. Near the intersection of Central Expressway and Mockingbird Lane is Southern Methodist University, and Mockingbird Station. In 2015 a small stretch between Knox-Henderson and Northwest Highway was re-designated as the George W. Bush Expressway.

The Dallas Area Rapid Transit light rail system has a tunnel underneath the North Central Expressway between downtown Dallas and Mockingbird Station.

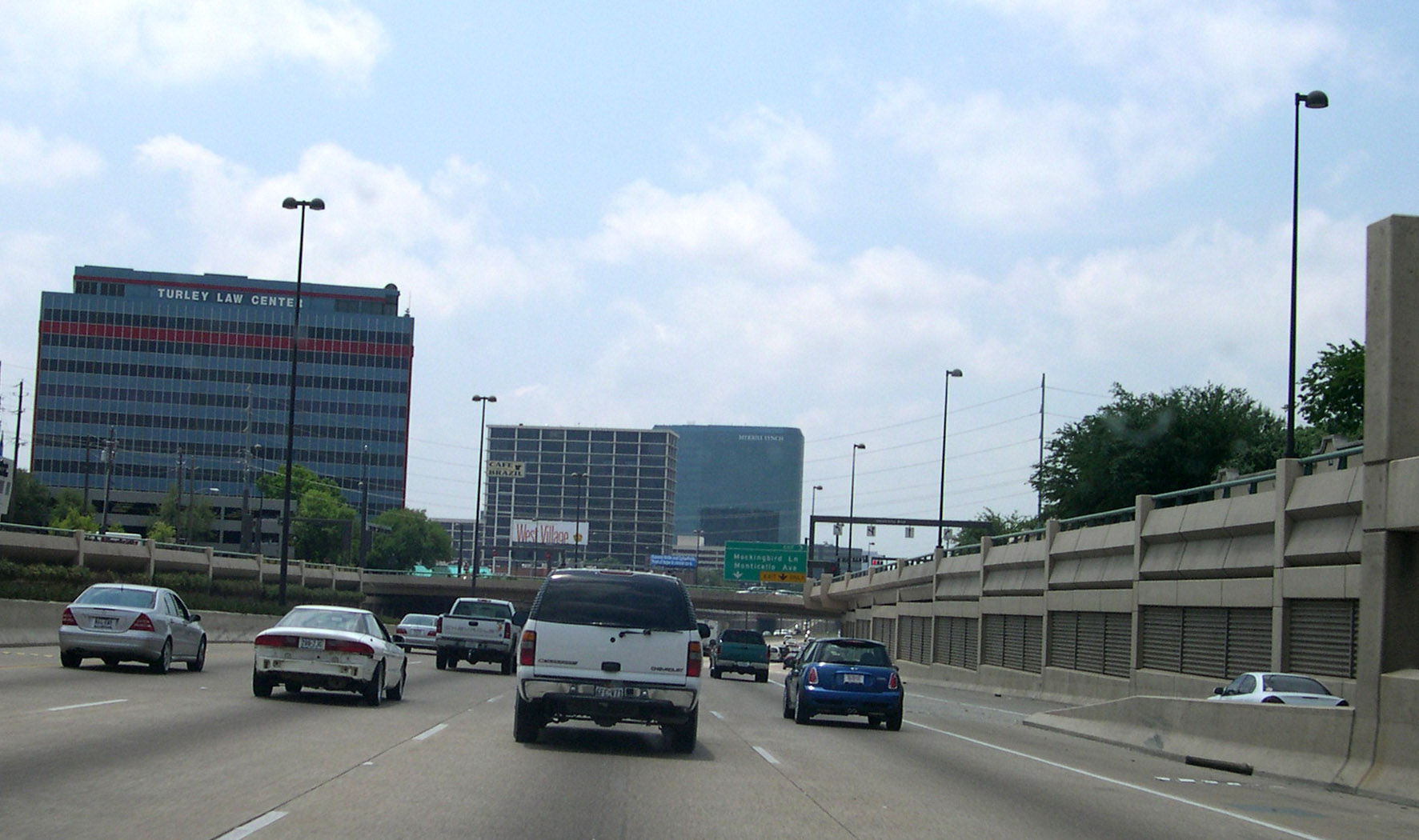
Central Expressway near Southern Methodist University and Mockingbird Lane

The freeway's architecturally distinctive design distinguishes it as one of the nation's most attractive urban freeways including 400,000 trees (bald cypress, yucca and honeysuckle), making it one of the most heavily landscaped freeways in Texas. Every structure and element along the highway right-of-way was given aesthetic attention during the design phase. Support columns for overpasses and bridges have been designed to be as visually appealing as possible. The beige concrete columns which form the support structure for the retaining walls contrast with the brown, textured infill panels of the walls to create a multicolored and articulated edge to the freeway. Two million square feet of these walls along the nine-mile-long (14 km) project distinguishes the freeway.

South of US 75's terminus, North Central Expressway briefly continues south in the median of I-345, then becomes a surface street through the eastern side of downtown Dallas. The surface street section south of Pacific Avenue was renamed for César Chávez in April, 2010. South of Cesar Chavez Blvd, State Highway 310 continues to carry the South Central Expressway name all the way to I-20 and I-45.

=== History ===
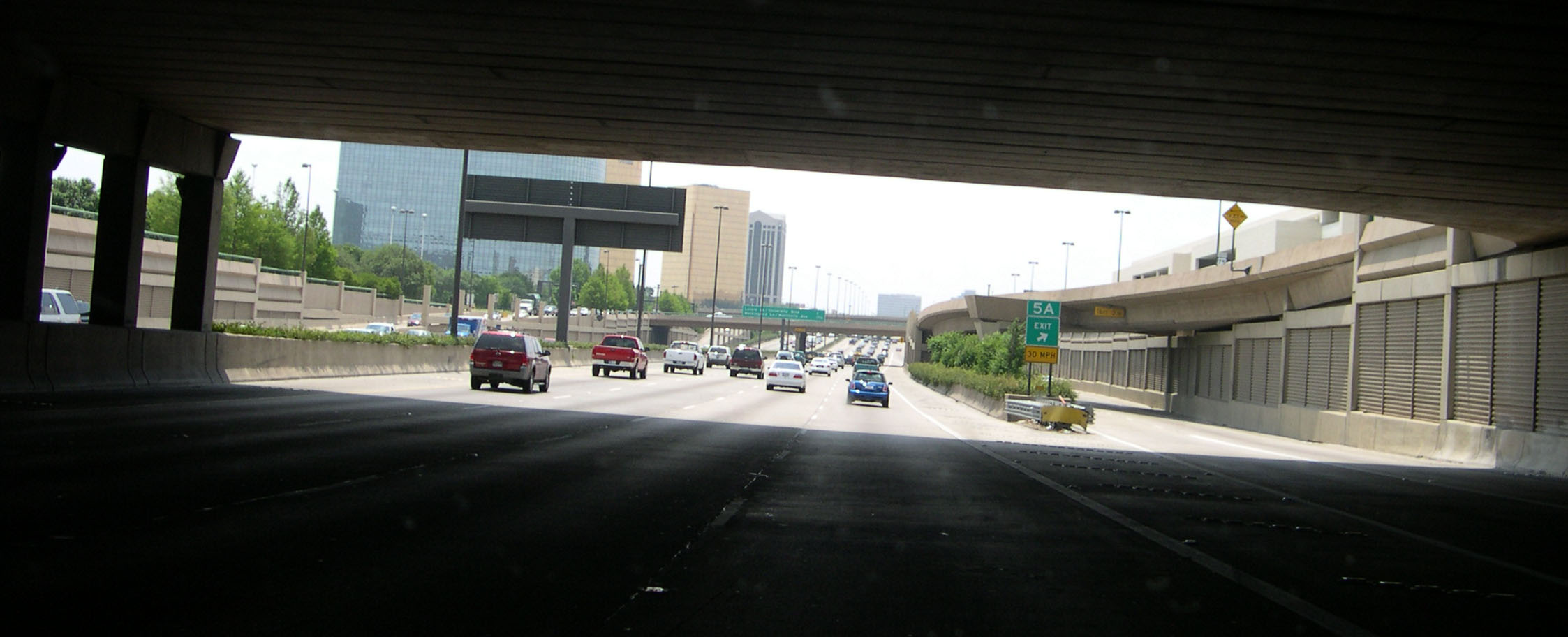
Central Expressway near NorthPark Center

The Central project was first proposed by Dallas City Planner George E. Kessler in his 1911 Kessler Plan, who suggested that the city buy the right of way of the Houston and Texas Central Railway (H&TC) to remove the railway tracks and construct a Central Boulevard (later renamed the Central Expressway project) in their place. The Central project became a real project in the 1920s (with first mention in The Dallas Morning News in December 1924), but resistance from the Southern Pacific railroad company proved to be a serious obstacle that delayed the project for decades. Southern Pacific opposed the use of their railroad's right of way to construct Central Expressway, and it was this opposition and lobbying of political forces that caused the significant delays in the construction to the early 1950s.

Parts of North Central Expressway were opened in 1950. The route from Downtown to Mockingbird Lane was fully functional by the end of 1952, and the whole route to Campbell Road in Richardson was opened for traffic in August 1956. By the time Central Expressway opened for traffic, North Dallas and Richardson had already expanded beyond expectations, and the new highway was already hopelessly inadequate by the 1960s. The Expressway did not reach the city of Anna and the northern Collin County line until late 1969 or early 1970.

==== Reconstruction ====
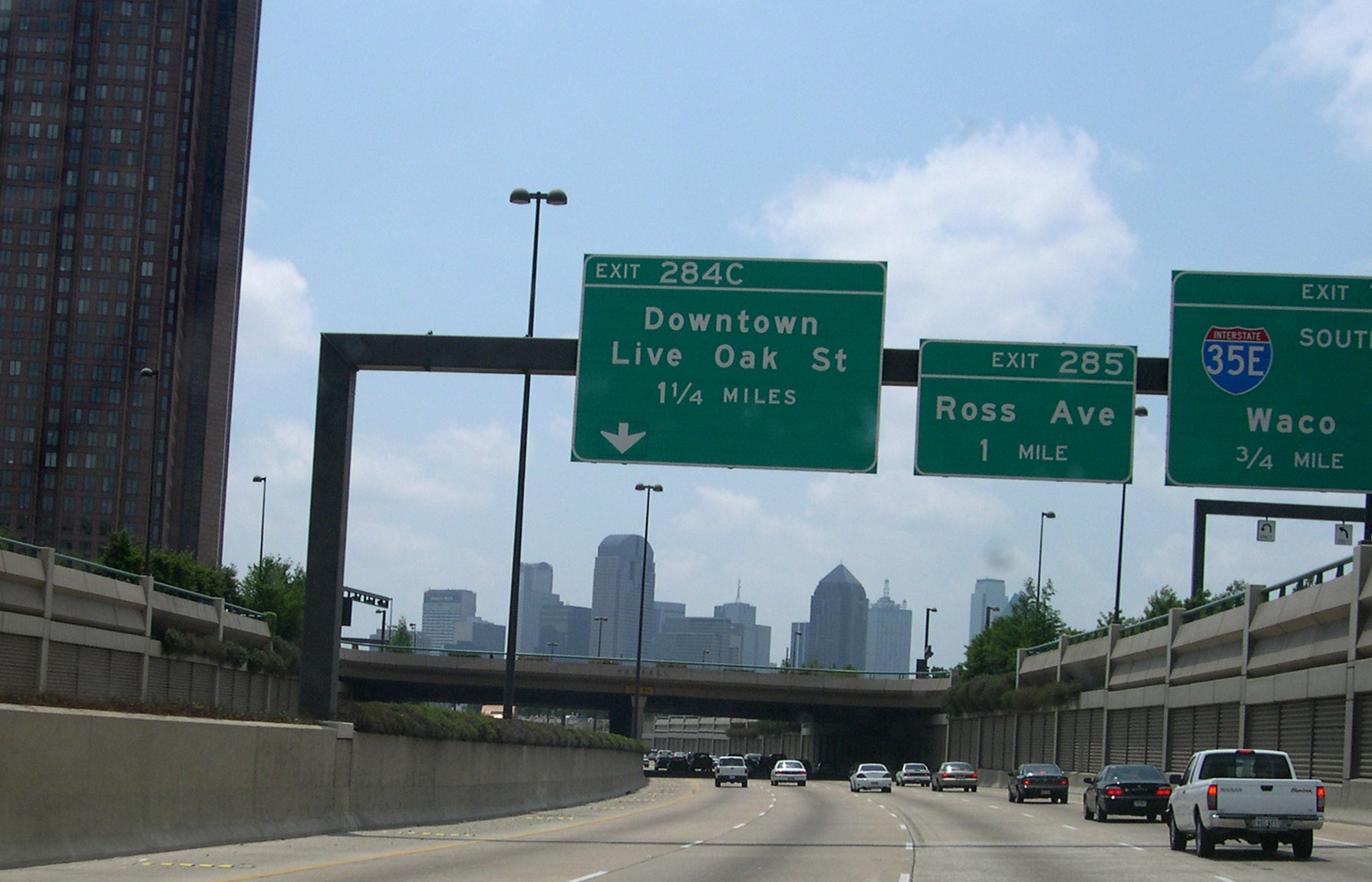
Central Expressway heading southbound, towards Downtown Dallas

Prior to reconstruction, the North Central Expressway was considered to be one of the most poorly designed freeways in the nation. Though initially an engineering marvel as Dallas's first freeway when it opened to traffic in 1950, the explosive growth that soon hit North Dallas and the nearby suburbs quickly overwhelmed its design and capacity. By the 1980s, the four-lane freeway had acquired a reputation for severe rush-hour traffic jams.

===== Freedman's Cemetery =====
During Central Expressway's construction in the 1940s, the southern end of the road was routed through a historic African-American neighborhood, displacing 1,500 black residents. When preparations began for the 1990s expansion of the route, it was discovered that a quarter of the 4-acre (16,000 m^{2}) Freedman's Cemetery, with graves dating back to Emancipation, had been paved over. Archeological excavations uncovered the remains of over 1100 men, women, and children under existing and proposed roadways. After their reburial, the site was turned into a memorial to the working-class black residents of the area, which, after the expressways were built, became the upscale Uptown Dallas neighborhood.

== South Central Expressway ==
From south of the Woodall Rodgers Freeway at exit 284C of "hidden" Interstate 345 in downtown Dallas, North Central Expressway becomes the South Central Expressway. The portion of South Central Expressway between I-345 and I-45 was renamed César Chávez Boulevard on April 9, 2010. This section through and south of downtown mainly serves local traffic. I-45 was built roughly parallel to it. However, the parallel section of I-45 north of the Trinity River is completely elevated, and is often difficult to traverse when ice storms hit Dallas (about once per year); thus, South Central often takes over some of the traffic during this time.

=== Route description ===
The road meets Interstate 30 at a three-level interchange and continues south as a surface road down to I-45. This section was renamed in honor of César Chávez in April, 2010. Upon crossing under I-45, it becomes State Highway 310 and is signed both as South Central Expressway and S.M. Wright Freeway (named for a local minister). After a short distance as a freeway, the road becomes at-grade again. After an interchange with US 175, the road returns to freeway standards for a while. the S.M. Wright Freeway name ends at Loop 12, past the end of freeway standards. The South Central Expressway continues past a partial interchange with Interstate 20 to end at a merge with I-45 north of Hutchins.

=== History ===
The US-175 designation has since been moved from the South Central/S.M. Wright and onto a newer alignment straight to I-45. The new section opened in 2020. The former US-175 alignment is now part of SH-310. Meanwhile, TxDOT is redesigning the portion of the South Central/S.M. Wright between I-45 and US 175's former east turn into a surface-street boulevard, and has held meetings with local residents about the project. The plan to convert the freeway into a tree-lined boulevard moved forward in 2018 after Dallas City Council approved the plan to accept maintenance responsibilities for the roadway once construction is completed.

== Exit list ==
County	Location	mi	km	Destinations	Notes
Dallas	Hutchins	0.000	0.000	I-45 south / SH 310 ends – Houston	Southern terminus; south end of SH 310 overlap
Dallas	See SH 310				
Dallas	Dallas			SH 310 north to I-45 / US 75 – Sherman	North end of SH 310 overlap; northbound exit and southbound entrance
Dallas	Dallas			Good-Latimer Expressway	Northbound exit and southbound entrance
Dallas	Dallas			I-30 (US 67) To I-35E (US 77)	I-30 exit 47A; I-35E exit 428A
Dallas	Dallas			Good-Latimer Expressway – Dallas Theological Seminary	At-grade intersection
Dallas	Dallas			Frontage Road	Northbound exit and southbound entrance
Dallas	Dallas			I-345 south to I-45 – Houston	South Central Expressway becomes North Central Expressway; south end of unsigned I-345 overlap; southbound exit and northbound entrance; I-345 exit 284C
Dallas	Dallas			I-345 ends / US 75 begins	North end of unsigned I-345 overlap; south end of US 75 overlap
See US 75
Collin	Van Alstyne			US 75 north / County Line Road	Northern terminus; north end of US 75 overlap; expressway continues into Grayson County as US 75 north
1.000 mi = 1.609 km; 1.000 km = 0.621 mi: Concurrency terminus; Incomplete access; Route transition

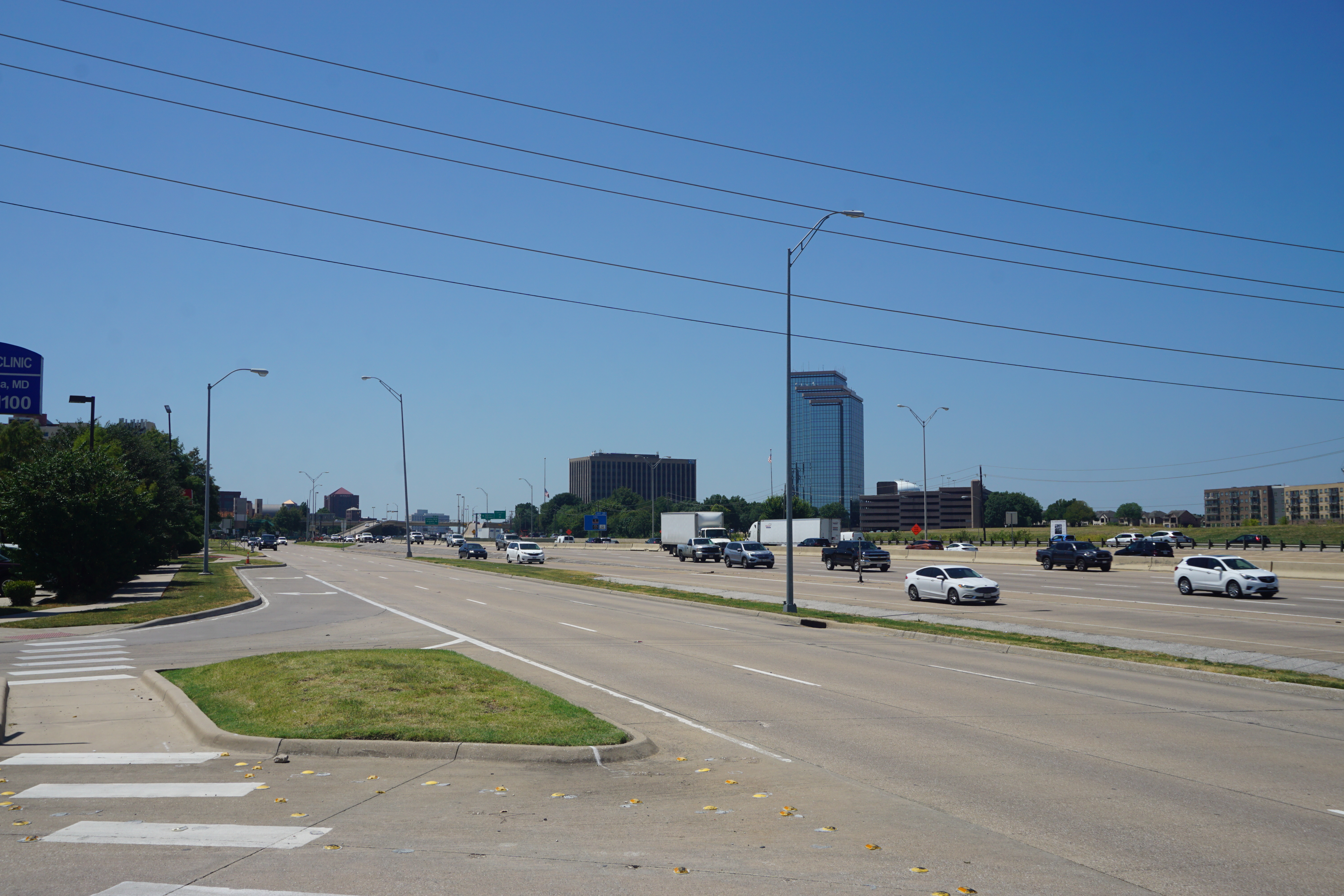
North Central Expressway in Richardson
