= Interstate 345 =

Unsigned highway in Texas

Interstate 345
- Central Dallas with I-345 highlighted in red

Route information
- Auxiliary route of I-45
- Maintained by TxDOT
- Length: 1.4 mi (2.3 km)
- Existed: August 23, 1973–present
- NHS: Entire route

Major junctions
- South end: I-30 / US 67 / I-45 in Dallas
- North end: US 75 / Spur 366 in Dallas

Location
- Country: United States
- State: Texas
- Counties: Dallas

Highway system
- Interstate Highway System; Main; Auxiliary; Suffixed; Business; Future; Highways in Texas; Interstate; US; State; Former; Toll; Loops; Spurs; FM/RM; Park; Rec
← SH 344	→ SH 345

Interstate 345 (I-345 (Note: Some sources use "IH-345", as "IH" is an abbreviation used by the Texas Department of Transportation for Interstate Highways.)) is an unsigned 1.4-mile-long (2.3 km) Auxiliary Interstate Highway in the city of Dallas within the US state of Texas. It is a freeway that connects I-45 (which ends at the interchange with I-30) with U.S. Highway 75 (US 75; North Central Expressway) at State Highway Spur 366 (Spur 366; Woodall Rodgers Freeway). Few maps actually display the road as I-345; signposts on the road show US 75 northbound, while southbound the highway is signed as I-45. In recent years, a debate over whether to maintain or decommission I-345 has received increased attention from several Dallas media outlets. TxDOT elected to maintain the freeway by lowering it below ground and removing frontage roads.

== Route description ==
I-345 serves as the connection between I-45 and the North Central Expressway (US 75). It starts at the junction of I-45 and I-30, passes by Downtown Dallas, and connects to US 75 at the Spur 366 junction. The entire stretch of I-345 is elevated allowing for better connections between Downtown Dallas and Deep Ellum.

Although I-345 uses its own mileposts, the exit numbering is not consistent. The exit numbers on the northbound stretch count upward from the I-45 numbers (the exit for Spur 366 being labeled as exit 286A), while, on the southbound stretch, the Spur 366 exit is numbered exit 1A, followed by the exit for Ross Avenue numbered exit 285.

== History ==
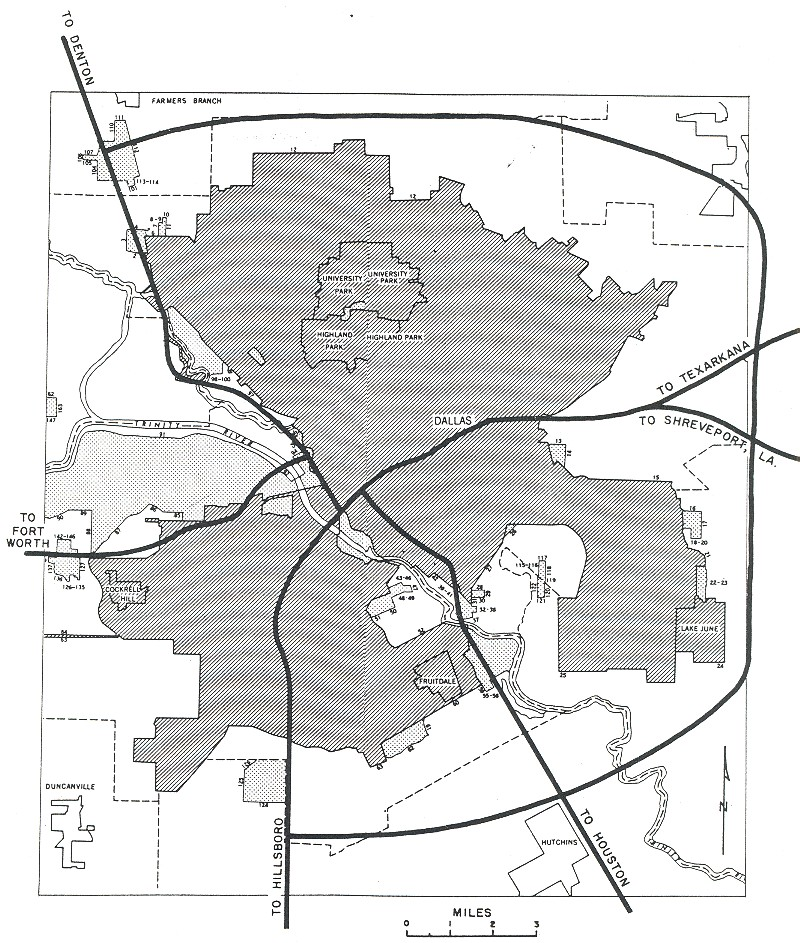
1955 "Yellow Book" plan for Interstates in Dallas

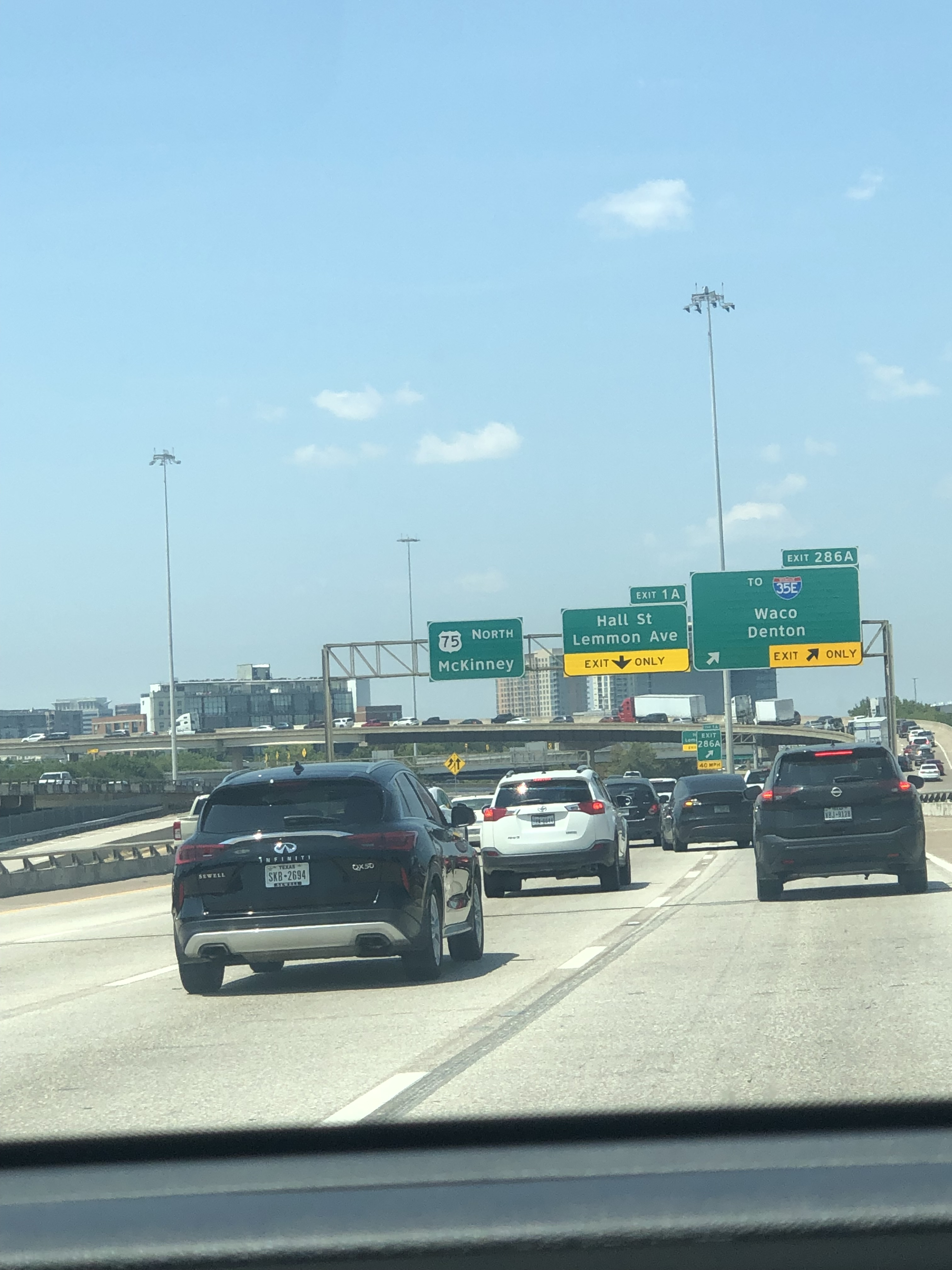
I-345’s eastern terminus with US 75 and Spur 366

In 1964, I-345, extending I-45 north along the proposed Central Expressway bypass, was added as a proposed state highway. I-345 was built and opened in the 1970s. At the north end, before it merged into the Central Expressway (which continued to carry US 75), I-345 straddled the bridges over Bryan Street and Ross Avenue, the latter the location of the opening ceremonies in 1949. Because of their location, these two bridges were not replaced in the 1990s reconstruction of the North Central Expressway and are the only surviving grade separations from the initial construction north from downtown.

== Future ==
There has recently been a growing level of local news coverage of a proposal to completely remove I-345 and decommission it from the Interstate Highway System due to the fact that the Interstate separates the Downtown Dallas and Deep Ellum neighborhoods.

The proposal would demolish the elevated structure, but, instead of replacing it with a below-grade structure (similar to that of Woodall Rogers), it would be replaced with an at-grade parkway and reconnected streets (some of which are disconnected by the current structure).

Media outlets, including The Dallas Morning News, the Dallas Observer, and D Magazine, first discussed the proposal in 2012 and 2013.

In February 2014, the Texas Department of Transportation (TxDOT) announced plans to spend $100 million (equivalent to $130 million in 2024) to repair the existing I-345 structure, but Dallas mayor Mike Rawlings responded by saying that the decommissioning/removal alternative should be further considered before any repair. After further investigation, Rawlings concluded that repairs should proceed in advance of a study and decision on the fate of the road.

In April 2014, Michael Morris, the transportation director of the North Central Texas Council of Governments, created controversy by suggesting that proponents of the decommissioning/removal are predominantly white, wealthy, and do not live in the area near I-345, as opposed to predominantly Black-American, working class, South Dallas residents that could be affected by the decommissioning/removal. Morris later apologized for his comments.

With its May 2014 issue, D Magazine became the first major local news publication to endorse the decommissioning/removal proposal.

In September 2016, TxDOT published the CityMAP Assessment Report, which included an analysis of the effects of highway removal on the I-345 corridor.

In April 2021, the Toole Design Group created a draft report to further study the impacts of the changes in mobility from the highway removal; the draft report was presented to Dallas city council.

In August 2022, TxDOT released the findings a feasibility study that was started in April 2018 that analyzed the future of I-345. The study analyzed five alternatives on what to do with the right-of-way of the interstate. The study concluded that depressing the freeway below grade and removing frontage roads would best fall in line with the CityMAP report. The alternative was also chosen due to the potential capping areas that were identified as being ways to link communities that were separated by I-345's construction. In May 2023, the Dallas City Council unanimously approved TxDOT's "refined hybrid" option that would rebuild I-345 as a depressed freeway traveling below street level with no frontage roads. The project entered its schematic and environmental phase in Summer 2023; the environmental assessment is expected to be submitted and approved by Spring 2025. Ceason Clemens, TxDOT's district engineer for Dallas, predicted it would take four to five years to secure funding then another five years for construction, with initial estimates putting construction costs at $1.65 billion.

== Exit list ==
The entire highway is in Dallas, Dallas County.

mi	km	Exit	Destinations	Notes
0.00	0.00		I-45 south – Houston	Continuation south
0.00	0.00	284A	I-30 (US 67)	Exits 46-47B on I-30
0.47	0.76	284B	Main Street west / Elm Street	Northbound exit and southbound entrance
0.81	1.30	284B	Live Oak Street	Southbound exit only
0.96– 1.23	1.54– 1.98	284C	Bryan Street east	Northbound exit only
0.96– 1.23	1.54– 1.98	285	Good-Latimer Expressway – Downtown	Southbound exit and northbound entrance
0.96– 1.23	1.54– 1.98	285	Ross Avenue	Southbound exit and northbound entrance
1.42	2.29	286A (NB); 1A (SB)	To I-35E (US 77) – Waco, Denton	Access via Spur 366 (Woodall Rodgers Freeway)
1.42	2.29		US 75 north – McKinney	Continuation north
1.000 mi = 1.609 km; 1.000 km = 0.621 mi: Incomplete access
