= Good-Latimer Expressway =

Highway in Dallas, Texas, USA

- Length: 2 mi (3.2 km)
- Location: Dallas, Texas
- South end: Al Lipscomb Way in Dallas
- North end: I-345 / US 75 in Dallas

The Good-Latimer Expressway is a street in the central part of Dallas, in the northeastern part of the U.S. state of Texas. It begins in south Dallas as an exit off U.S. Highway 175 (US 175) at that highway's western terminus at Interstate 45 (I-45). The street travels in a north-northwest direction through south Dallas, the Cedars, the Farmers Market District of downtown, and finally through Deep Ellum. It becomes Routh Street as it passes out of Deep Ellum underneath I-345 / US 75. It was part of US 75 until 1987, connecting the two freeway sections of the Central Expressway.

State Highway Spur 559
- Location: Dallas County
- Existed: January 28, 1987–June 25, 1991

From January 28, 1987, to June 25, 1991, when the portion between I-45 and I-345 / US 75 was given to the city of Dallas, that segment was Spur 559.

The expressway was named for former Mayor and Judge John Jay Good and James W. "Weck" Latimer, editor of the Dallas Herald, both citizens from Dallas' pioneer past.
