= Texas State Highway 91 =

State highway in Texas

State Highway 91
- SH 91 highlighted in red

Route information
- Maintained by TxDOT
- Length: 13.609 mi (21.902 km)
- Existed: 1994–present

Major junctions
- South end: US 75 in Sherman
- US 82 in Sherman
- North end: SH-91 at the Oklahoma state line near Denison

Location
- Country: United States
- State: Texas

Highway system
- Highways in Texas; Interstate; US; State; Former; Toll; Loops; Spurs; FM/RM; Park; Rec
← SH 90	→ SH 92
← SH 75	SH 75A	→ SH 76

State Highway 91 (SH 91) is a state highway in the U.S. state of Texas that runs 13.6 miles (21.9 km) from Sherman through Denison to the Oklahoma state line at Denison Dam at Lake Texoma (where it connects with Oklahoma State Highway 91) . This route was designated in 1994, the northern segment replacing State Highway 75A) (designated in 1946 as an alternate route to US 75 after Denison Dam was completed the previous year) and the southern segment designating the old route of U.S. Highway 75 which was rerouted and upgraded to freeway status. The highway is known locally as Texoma Parkway for much of its length, except through some parts of Denison. It is one of the main commercial strips in the Sherman-Denison metropolitan area.

== History ==
The original SH 91 was designated on October 15, 1923, on a similar route from Denison north to a different Red River crossing west of the current one, where it connected with Oklahoma Highway 48 (now OK-70A). This route was transferred to FM 84 on October 26, 1943, when portions of SH 91 were submerged in the rising Lake Texoma.

The current routing of SH 91 was originally built on May 18, 1944, as State Spur 151, connecting the newly completed Denison Dam along the Red River to the city of Denison. The route was renumbered on January 26, 1946, to State Highway 75A. This was to correlate with the similarly numbered Oklahoma Highway 75A that it connected to at the Red River. Both of these routes were numbered 75A to provide an alternate route for US Route 75, which crossed the Red River about 2 miles downstream from the dam. SH 75A extended south from FM 84 (former SH 91) to the new location of US 75 The route originally ended on the northwest side of Denison connecting with the original route of US 75, but was extended southward through the residential sections of town to the new intersection with US 75 when it was rerouted along the eastern side of town. The route was extended a final time in 1994 when US 75 was again rerouted around Denison, this time as a limited access highway to the west of town on March 29, 1957. On September 23, 1959, the bridge to Oklahoma was added to the designation. The route was extended south along Business US 75 to the north side of Sherman on December 21, 1994. State Highway 75A was also renumbered to State Highway 91 at this time to prevent confusion with the main US Route and was again coordinated with a renumbering of the adjacent Oklahoma State Highway 91.

== Route description ==
State Highway 91 begins at an intersection with US Route 75, exit 61, on the north side of Sherman. The route travels to the northeast, paralleling railroad tracks, quickly reaching a limited access intersection with US Route 82. The route continues northeast along the old routing of US 75, reaching an intersection with State Spur 503 on the far south side of Denison. The route then continues northward through residential sections of western Denison before exiting town to the northwest. Just outside Denison it has another intersection with US 75. The route continues northwest, reaching Denison Dam at the Red River. The route ends at the state line, while the route continues across the top of the dam as Oklahoma State Highway 91.

== Major intersections ==
County	Location	mi	km	Destinations	Notes
Grayson	Sherman	0.0	0.0	US 75	US 75 exit 61; southern terminus
Grayson	Sherman	1.5	2.4	US 82 – Gainesville, Bonham	US 82 exit 643
Grayson	Denison	5.7	9.2	Spur 503 (Eisenhower Parkway) to US 69	Spur 503 exit 598
Grayson	Denison	8.9	14.3	FM 120 (West Morton Street) – Pottsboro, Carpenter's Bluff	
Grayson	Denison	10.1	16.3	FM 84	
Grayson	Denison	11.9	19.2	US 75 – Sherman	US 75 exit 72
Grayson		13.4	21.6	FM 1310 west – Eisenhower State Park	
Lake Texoma		13.6	21.9	Continues into Oklahoma as SH-91 east	
1.000 mi = 1.609 km; 1.000 km = 0.621 mi
