= Texas State Highway Spur 503 =

Highway in Texas

State Highway Spur 503
- Eisenhower Parkway

Route information
- Maintained by TxDOT
- Length: 3.556 mi (5.723 km)
- Existed: 1972–present

Major junctions
- West end: US 75 in Denison
- SH 91 in Denison
- East end: US 69 in Denison

Location
- Country: United States
- State: Texas

Highway system
- Highways in Texas; Interstate; US; State; Former; Toll; Loops; Spurs; FM/RM; Park; Rec
← Spur 502	→ SH 550

Spur 503, also known locally as Eisenhower Parkway is state highway spur route in southern Denison, Texas. The highway is a limited access freeway from US 75 to SH 91. The rest of the route is a surface street to its terminus at US 69. The entire route contains frontage roads.

== History ==
The highway was originally part of US 75 until the "Katy Memorial Freeway" was built to bypass Denison. US 75 was transferred on to its present route and the old route was re-designated as Spur 503 on March 1, 1972. On December 21, 1994, Spur 503 was extended from SH 91 to US 69, replacing part of Business U.S. 75.

== Junction list ==
The entire route is in Denison, Grayson County.

mi	km	Exit	Destinations	Notes
0.0	0.0	596	US 75 – Dallas, Durant	Exit 596 is for 75 northbound; US 75 exit 66; western terminus; last westbound exit before US 75 south is FM 691
0.6– 1.2	0.97– 1.9	598	SH 91 (Texoma Parkway) – Sherman	Signed as exits 597 (north) and 598 (south) eastbound; east end of freeway
3.5	5.6		US 69 – Denison, Greenville	
1.000 mi = 1.609 km; 1.000 km = 0.621 mi
