= Trumbull, Texas =

- Unincorporated community
- Location within the state of Texas Trumbull (the United States)
- Coordinates: 32°29′26″N 96°39′56″W
- Country: United States
- State: Texas
- County: Ellis
- Elevation: 459 ft (140 m)
- Time zone: UTC-6 (Central (CST))
  - Summer (DST): UTC-5 (CDT)
- GNIS feature ID: 1348818

Trumbull is an unincorporated community in Ellis County, Texas, United States.

== Geography ==
The community is located on Interstate 45, approximately 23 miles (37 km) southeast of Downtown Dallas.

== History ==
In 1872, the Houston and Texas Central Railway developed a railroad switch south of Dallas, along its 1872 rail line extension from Houston to Dallas. Known simply as "Switch", the area would later be called by a variety of names: "Ghost Hill", then "Mackie", then "Clemma", before becoming "Trumbull" in 1904. A post office was established in 1896, but was discontinued in 1967.

== Education ==
Trumbull is serviced by the Ferris Independent School District.
