= American Public Works Association =

- Abbreviation: APWA
- Predecessor: American Society of Municipal Improvements; American Society of Municipal Engineers
- Founded: January 1, 1937; 89 years ago
- Merger of: International Association of Public with Works Officials
- Type: Nonprofit
- Tax ID no.: 36-2202880
- Professional title: CPWP
- Headquarters: Kansas City, Missouri, U.S.
- Location: Washington, D.C.
- Members: 32,000
- Website: apwa.net

The American Public Works Association (APWA) is a nonprofit, professional association of public works agencies, private companies, and individuals dedicated to promoting professional excellence and public awareness through education, advocacy, and the exchange of knowledge. APWA is headquartered in Kansas City, Missouri, and has an office in Washington, D.C.

== History ==
The American Society of Municipal Improvements (ASMI) was established in 1894 in Buffalo, New York to advance municipal engineering, infrastructure standards, and scientific urban management. The formation resulted from the "White City" architecture at the 1893's World's Columbian Exposition in Chicago. The society was then renamed to the American Society of Municipal Engineers (AME) in 1930. In 1937, AME merged with the International Association of Public with Works Officials (IAPWO) to form the American Public Works Association (APWA).

Membership in the society is open to any individual, agency, or corporation with an interest in public works and infrastructure issues. There are 55 chapters in the United States and eight in Canada.
