= Texas State Highway 310 =

Highway in Texas

State Highway 310
- SH 310 highlighted in red

Route information
- Maintained by TxDOT
- Length: 6.7 mi (10.8 km)
- Existed: 1987–present

Major junctions
- South end: I-45 in Hutchins
- I-20 in Hutchins; Loop 12 in Dallas
- North end: US 175 in Dallas

Location
- Country: United States
- State: Texas

Highway system
- Highways in Texas; Interstate; US; State; Former; Toll; Loops; Spurs; FM/RM; Park; Rec
← SH 309	→ SH 311

State Highway 310 (SH 310) is an 6.7-mile (10.8 km) north–south state highway located mostly within Dallas. It is a portion of the old route of U.S. Highway 75 (US 75) along the Central Expressway, which now ends in downtown Dallas. The road, located within Hutchins and South Dallas, has been replaced as the major through route by Interstate 45 (I-45). SH 310 is known as the South Central Expressway south of its intersection with Loop 12 and the S. M. Wright Freeway north of it.

== Route description ==
SH 310 begins at I-45 and ends at US 175. It begins at I-45 in Hutchins as an arterial road named the South Central Expressway and intersects I-20 before entering Dallas. Passing through South Dallas, SH 310 has an interchange with Loop 12, taking on the name of the S. M. Wright Freeway. At the intersection with Overton Road, SH 310 becomes an expressway and promptly crosses the Trinity River. Continuing on, SH 310 ends at interchange with US 175.

Previously, after intersecting a couple side roads just south of Elsie Faye Heggins Street, SH 310 became a full fledged freeway, having an interchange with the aforementioned arterial. Continuing on, SH 310 had interchanges at Pine Street, Metropolitan Avenue, Pennsylvania Avenue, and Martin Luther King Jr. Boulevard before it ended at an interchange with I-45, Cesar Chavez Boulevard, and the Good-Latimer Expressway near downtown Dallas.

SH 310 north of Loop 12 was co-named the S.M. Wright Freeway in 1995 by Governor George W. Bush after the Reverend S.M. Wright (1927-1994). Wright was a local pastor and civil rights leader from South Dallas. It is still technically also referred to as the Central Expressway, as it is a former portion of that road. In practice, Dallasites refer to the current US 75 (the portion north of downtown) as Central Expressway and the decommissioned US 75 (the portion south of downtown) as the S.M. Wright Freeway.

The southbound Trinity River bridge is the original simple steel girder bridge from abutment to abutment while the northbound is newer and largely precast concrete - the only steel girders are the longer spans directly over the river. The southbound bridge was repainted by CEKRA for TxDOT in late 2015.

Through southern Dallas, I-45 (also named the Julius Schepps Freeway) has replaced SH 310 as the through route. However, as I-45 is completely elevated between downtown and the Trinity River, during freezing rain events it is virtually impassable, whereupon it is closed and traffic is diverted onto SH 310.

== History ==
An earlier SH 310 was designated on February 20, 1939 from SH 29 to the Lockhart Recreation Center. On September 26, 1939, SH 310 was cancelled and transferred to PR 10. The current SH 310 was designated on January 28, 1987, replacing part of US 75 from US 175 south to I-45. On April 29, 2013, SH 310 was extended north from US 175 to I-45, replacing part of US 175, which was designated to be rerouted on a more direct route west to I-45. The rerouting of US 175 was opened to traffic in 2020, with I-45 south to US 175 east opening in March and the other direction in early July 2020.

== Future ==
The S.M. Wright Project is a highway project by TxDOT which seeks to bring improvements to the major highways in South Dallas. The project mainly seeks to convert the S.M. Wright Freeway into the S.M. Wright Parkway, a six-lane arterial with at-grade intersections. Phase I involved rerouting US 175 off the S.M. Wright Freeway onto a brand new extension of the C.F. Hawn Freeway which directly connects into I-45. In addition to this, improvements were made to I-45 directly north of said interchange. Phase I was completed in early June 2020. Phase II involves converting the S.M. Wright Freeway between US 175 and I-45 into an arterial. In addition to that, improvements with its interchange with I-45, Cesar Chavez Boulevard, and the Good-Latimer Expressway will be made. Phase II is scheduled for completion in fall 2023. On February 26, 2026, the section north of US 175 was given to the city of Dallas.

== Major intersections ==
The entire route is in Dallas County.

Location	mi	km	Destinations	Notes
Hutchins	0.00	0.00	I-45 south	Southern termini of SH-310 and South Central Expressway; south end of South Central Expwy. overlap; I-45 exit 275
Hutchins–Dallas line	0.5	0.80	I-20 east	I-20 exit 474
Dallas	3.5	5.6	Loop 12 – DART	Cloverleaf interchange; access to Ledbetter station
Dallas	5.7	9.2	Lamar Street	Interchange; northbound exit and southbound entrance
Dallas	6.3	10.1	Carlton Garrett Street	Interchange; northbound exit only
Dallas	6.7	10.8	US 175 east (C.F. Hawn Freeway)	Interchange with signals on SH 310; northern terminus
Dallas	7.0	11.3	Elsie Faye Heggins Street	Former diamond interchange; converted to at-grade intersection circa 2023; was signed under former name of Hatcher Street
Dallas	7.3	11.7	Pine Street	Former diamond interchange; converted to at-grade intersection circa 2023
Dallas	7.7	12.4	Metropolitan Avenue	Former diamond interchange; converted to at-grade intersection circa 2023
Dallas	7.9	12.7	Pennsylvania Avenue	Former diamond interchange; northbound exit and southbound entrance; converted to at-grade intersection circa 2023
Dallas	8.1	13.0	Martin Luther King Jr. Boulevard	Former diamond interchange; converted to at-grade intersection circa 2023
Dallas	8.3	13.4	Cesar Chavez Boulevard / Good-Latimer Expressway	Former diamond interchange; northbound exit and southbound entrance; converted to at-grade intersection circa 2023
Dallas	8.3	13.4	I-45 north to US 75 – Sherman	Former northern terminus before 2026; I-45 exit 283B
1.000 mi = 1.609 km; 1.000 km = 0.621 mi: Concurrency terminus; Closed/former; Incomplete access
