= Business routes of Interstate 45 =

Business Interstate 45

Route information
- Maintained by TxDOT

Location
- Country: United States
- State: Texas

Highway system
- Interstate Highway System; Main; Auxiliary; Suffixed; Business; Future; Highways in Texas; Interstate; US; State; Former; Toll; Loops; Spurs; FM/RM; Park; Rec

All of the business loops are maintained by the Texas Department of Transportation (TxDOT). Interstate 45 (I-45) has four business loops in the state, all located in northern Texas. Along I-45, TxDOT identifies each business route as Business Interstate 45 followed by an alphabetic suffix. Along Texas Interstates, the alphabetic suffixes on business route names ascend eastward and northward. There are gaps in the alphabetic values to allow for future system expansion. The alphabetic naming suffixes are included as small letters on the bottom of route shields.

I-45 business routes generally follow the path of the former U.S. Highway 75 (US 75) through the central portions of towns now bypassed by the Interstate route.

== Corsicana business loop ==
Business Interstate 45-F
- Location: Navarro County
- Length: 6.367 mi (10.247 km)
- Existed: 1991–present

Business Interstate 45-F (Bus. I-45-F) is a business loop of I-45 that passes through Corsicana in Navarro County. The route begins at I-45 exit 228B and ends at exit 235 and travels along 7th Street. The highway has an intersection with Bus. U.S. Highway 287 (Bus. US 287) and an interchange with State Highway 31 (SH 31).

The highway was designated in 1991 when State Highway Loop 564 (Loop 564) was decommissioned.

Junction list

The entire route is in Navarro County.

Location	mi	km	Destinations	Notes
Corsicana	0.0	0.0	I-45 – Richland	I-45 exit 228B
Corsicana	1.1	1.8	Bus. US 287 south	
Corsicana	1.7	2.7	SH 31 (7th Avenue) – Waco, Athens	Interchange
	6.4	10.3	I-45 (US 287)	I-45 exit 235
1.000 mi = 1.609 km; 1.000 km = 0.621 mi

== Ennis business loop ==
Business Interstate 45-G
- Location: Ennis
- Length: 4.512 mi (7.261 km)
- Existed: 1991–present

Business Interstate 45-G (Bus. I-45-G) is a business loop of I-45 that passes through Ennis in Ellis County. The route begins at I-45 exit 249 (where Farm to Market Road 85 (FM 85) also begins) and ends at exit 253. The highway travels along Kaufman Street and has overlaps with Bus. US 287 and SH 34 and also has a major intersection with State Highway Spur 469 (Spur 469) and FM 1181.

The route was designated in 1991 when Spur 563 was decommissioned.

Junction list

The entire route is in Ennis, Ellis County.

mi	km	Destinations	Notes
0.0	0.0	I-45 / FM 85 east – Dallas, Corsicana, Seven Points	South end of Bus. US 287 overlap; I-45 exit 249
1.4	2.3	SH 34 south / FM 1181 east (Creechville Road) – Italy, Telico	South end of SH 34 overlap
2.2	3.5	Bus. US 287 north / SH 34 north (Ennis Avenue) – Waxahachie, Kaufman	North end of Bus. US 287 / SH 34 overlap
3.7	6.0	Spur 469 north (Old Dallas Highway)	
4.5	7.2	I-45 – Dallas, Corsicana	I-45 exit 253
1.000 mi = 1.609 km; 1.000 km = 0.621 mi: Concurrency terminus

== Palmer business loop ==
Business Interstate 45-H
- Location: Palmer
- Length: 2.33 mi (3.75 km)
- Existed: 1991–present

Business Interstate 45-H (Bus. I-45-H) travels through Palmer in Ellis County. The route begins at I-45 exit 258 and ends at exit 260. The highway travels along Dallas Street and has a major intersection with FM 813.

The highway was designated in 1991 when Loop 562 was decommissioned.

Junction list

The entire route is in Palmer, Ellis County.

mi	km	Destinations	Notes
0.0	0.0	I-45 / Parker Hill Road – Dallas, Ennis	I-45 exit 258
1.2	1.9	FM 813 (Jefferson Street) – Rockett, Bristol	
2.3	3.7	I-45 – Dallas, Corsicana	I-45 exit 260
1.000 mi = 1.609 km; 1.000 km = 0.621 mi

== Ferris business loop ==
Business Interstate 45-J
- Location: Dallas and Ellis counties
- Length: 3.367 mi (5.419 km)
- Existed: 1991–present

Business Interstate 45-J (Bus. I-45-J) is a business loop of I-45 that passes through Ferris in Ellis County and also briefly travels through a portion of Wilmer in Dallas County. The highway begins at I-45 exit 265 and ends at exit 268. The road travels through Ferris along Central Street and has major intersections with Farm to Market Road 660 and Farm to Market Road 983.

The highway was designated in 1991 when Texas State Highway Loop 560 was decommissioned.

Junction list

County	Location	mi	km	Destinations	Notes
Ellis		0.0	0.0	I-45 – Dallas, Ennis	I-45 exit 265
Ellis	Ferris	1.3	2.1	FM 660 east (8th Street) – Bristol	
Ellis	Ferris	1.4	2.3	FM 983 south (5th Street) – Rockett	
Dallas		3.4	5.5	I-45 south / Loop 9 west / Malloy Bridge Road	I-45 exit 268.
1.000 mi = 1.609 km; 1.000 km = 0.621 mi
