= Interstate 45 =

Interstate Highway in Texas

Interstate 45
- I-45 highlighted in red

Route information
- Maintained by TxDOT
- Length: 284.91 mi (458.52 km)
- Existed: August 14, 1957–present
- NHS: Entire route

Major junctions
- South end: SH 87 / Spur 342 in Galveston
- SH 99 Toll SH 99 in Houston; I-610 in Houston; US 90 Alt. in Houston; I-69 / US 59 in Houston; I-10 / US 90 in Houston; US 190 from Huntsville to Madisonville; US 79 in Buffalo; US 84 in Fairfield; US 287 from Corsicana to Ennis; I-20 in Dallas; US 175 in Dallas
- North end: I-30 / I-345 / US 67 in Dallas

Location
- Country: United States
- State: Texas
- Counties: Galveston, Harris, Montgomery, Walker, Madison, Leon, Freestone, Navarro, Ellis, Dallas

Highway system
- Interstate Highway System; Main; Auxiliary; Suffixed; Business; Future; Highways in Texas; Interstate; US; State; Former; Toll; Loops; Spurs; FM/RM; Park; Rec
← SH 44	→ SH 45

Interstate 45 (I-45 (Note: Some sources use "IH-45", as "IH" is an abbreviation used by TxDOT for Interstate Highways.)) is a major Interstate Highway located entirely within the U.S. state of Texas. While most primary Interstate routes which have numbers ending in "5" are cross-country north–south routes, I-45 is comparatively short, with the entire route located within Texas. Additionally, it has the shortest length of all the primary Interstates divisible by 5. It connects the cities of Dallas and Houston, continuing southeast from Houston to Galveston over the Galveston Causeway to the Gulf of Mexico.

I-45 replaced U.S. Highway 75 (US 75) over its entire length, although portions of US 75 remained parallel to I-45 until its elimination south of Downtown Dallas in 1987. At the south end of I-45, State Highway 87 (SH 87, formerly part of US 75) continues into downtown Galveston. The north end is at I-30 in Downtown Dallas, where US 75 used the Good-Latimer Expressway. A short continuation, known by traffic reporters as the I-45 overhead, signed as part of US 75 and also part of unsigned I-345, continues north to the merge with the current end of US 75. Traffic can use Spur 366 (better known locally as the Woodall Rodgers Freeway) to connect to I-35E at the north end of I-345.

The portion of I-45 between Downtown and Galveston is known to Houston residents as the Gulf Freeway. The short elevated section of I-45, which forms the southern boundary of Downtown, is known as the Pierce Elevated after the surface street next to which the freeway runs, while north of I-10 it is known as the North Freeway. I-45 and I-345 in the Dallas area, north of the interchanges with I-20 and SH 310 (old US 75), is the Julius Schepps Freeway. The Gulf Freeway and North Freeway both include reversible high-occupancy vehicle lane (HOV lanes) for busses and other HOVs to and from Downtown.

The freeway is the subject of ongoing controversy and federal investigation due to a proposed expansion project in Harris County, which would displace hundreds of people from their homes and worsen air quality. The local authorities have opposed the expansion project, while the Texas Department of Transportation (TxDOT) supports expansion, and negotiations are pending. The project's estimated cost is at least $9.7 billion and is expected to take at least two decades to complete.

== Route description ==
In addition to the official control cities of Galveston, Houston, and Dallas, I-45 serves a number of other communities, including Texas City, La Marque, League City, Spring, The Woodlands, Conroe, Willis, Huntsville, Madisonville, Centerville, Buffalo, Fairfield, Corsicana, and Ennis.

US 190 joins I-45 for 26 miles (42 km) from Huntsville to Madisonville. US 287 joins I-45 for 18 miles (29 km) from Corsicana to Ennis. US 287 signs are only posted (with I-45) from the northern end of Business I-45-F (Bus. I-45-F) in Corsicana to the Ellis County line.

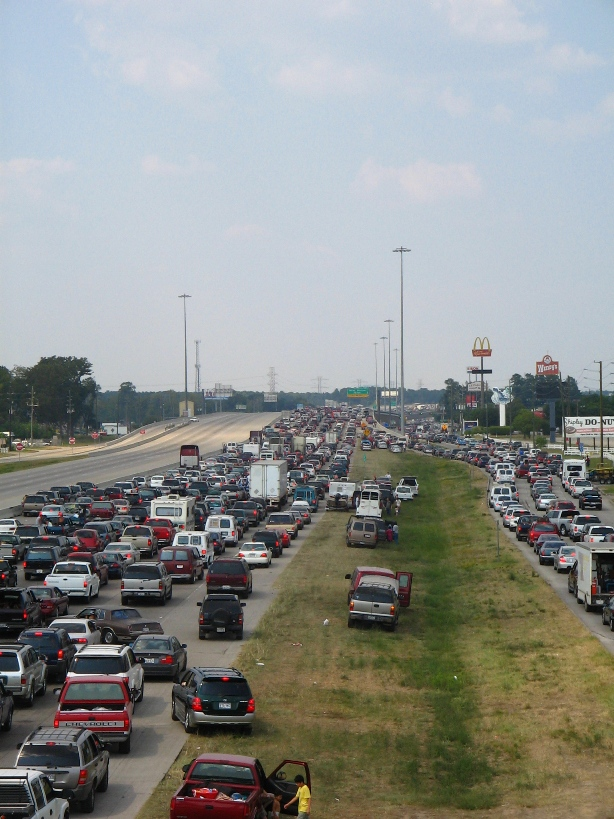
Hurricane Rita evacuation from the Louetta Road (exit 68) overpass (2005)

I-45 gained notoriety during Hurricane Rita in 2005. Thousands of Houston area evacuees jammed the roadway trying to leave. As a result, the freeway became a parking lot. Gas stations ran dry and hundreds of people's cars simply ran empty, their occupants having to spend the night along the shoulder. Four-hour drives suddenly became 24-hour drives. Even though TxDOT started contraflow lane reversal at Farm to Market Road 1488 (FM 1488), it did not alleviate the traffic jam deep into the city, as that starting point was even north of The Woodlands, which is close to Conroe, the northern terminus of Greater Houston.

At just 284.91 miles (458.52 km), I-45 is the shortest of the primary Interstates (ending in 0 or 5) and the only primary Interstate to be entirely inside of one state.

=== Gulf Freeway ===
The stretch of I-45 connecting Galveston with Houston is known as the Gulf Freeway. It was the first freeway built in Texas—opened in stages beginning on October 1, 1948, up to a full completion to Galveston in 1952, as part of US 75. At the north (Houston) end, it connects to the North Freeway via the short Pierce Elevated, completed in 1967. The section north of the curve near SH 3/Monroe Road in southeastern Houston was built on the right-of-way of the former Galveston–Houston Electric Railway, which entered downtown on Pierce Street.

After several interchanges, I-45 crosses the Galveston Causeway and passes Tiki Island. Old US 75 south of this junction was upgraded on the spot.

The Gulf Freeway generally parallels SH 3 (old US 75) about one mile (1.6 km) to the west, bypassing La Marque, Dickinson, and South Houston. It includes interchanges with several other freeways: FM 1764 (Emmett F. Lowry Expressway), State Highway NASA Road 1 (NASA Road 1), and the Sam Houston Tollway (Beltway 8), meeting the north end of SH 3 in southeastern Houston. (This part of SH 3—on Winkler Drive and Monroe Road—is not part of old US 75.) A center reversible HOV lane begins just south of the Sam Houston Tollway.

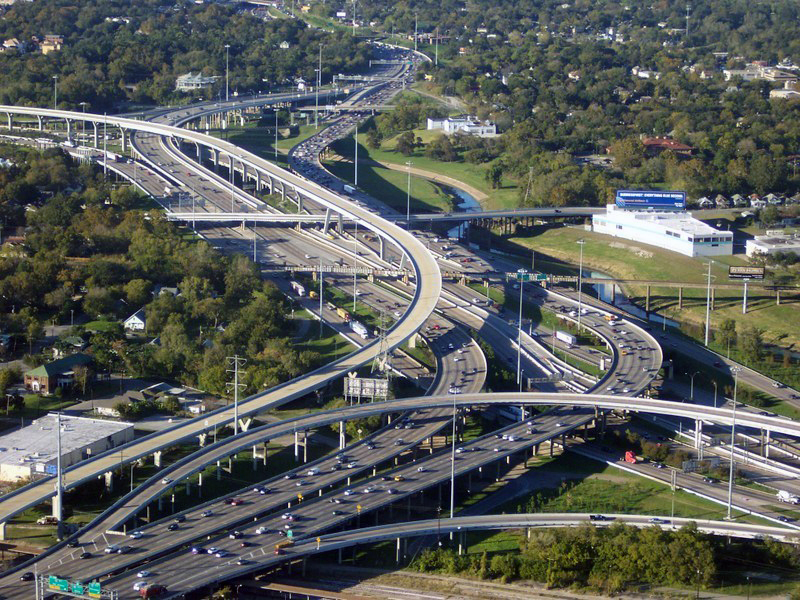
I-45 and I-10/US 90 next to Downtown Houston

In Houston, I-45 meets I-610 and SH 35 at a complicated interchange. At the merge with Spur 5, a short freeway spur to the University of Houston, elevated collector–distributor roads (also part of Spur 5) begin. The collector–distributor roads and the HOV lane end at Emancipation Avenue, the original end of the Gulf Freeway. Just past Emancipation Avenue is an interchange with I-69/US 59 (Eastex and Southwest freeways) and SH 288 (South Freeway), after which I-45 technically becomes the North Freeway as it runs along the northwest half of the block between Pierce Street and Gray Street as the Pierce Elevated.

The reversible HOV lane begins in Downtown at the intersection of St. Joseph Parkway and Emancipation Avenue, with easy access inbound to St. Joseph Parkway and outbound from Pierce Street. It runs down the median of the Gulf Freeway, mostly at the same level as the mainlanes. Ramps are provided for access to and from the following roads:

- Eastwood Transit Center (full access)
- I-610 north frontage road (full access)
- Monroe Road and Monroe Park & Ride (full access)
- Fuqua Park & Ride and South Point Park & Ride (full access)
- Frontage roads north of Dixie Farm Road (FM 1959) (toward Downtown, with a ramp stub for continuation)

The abandoned marshy land between Harris and Galveston through which the I-45 runs became known as the Texas Killing Fields because over 30 dead bodies have been found in the area.

=== North Freeway ===
The I-45 North Freeway HOV begins in downtown Houston near the University of Houston–Downtown, with easy access inbound on Milam Street and outbound on Travis Street. Ramps and entrances are provided for access from the following roads. All are fully accessible.

- I-10/US 90 westbound exit and entrance only
- Quitman Street
- Airline Drive (to Crosstimbers Road)
- North Shepherd (to North Shepherd Park & Ride)
- FM 525 (Aldine-Bender Road)
- Kuykendahl Park & Ride
- FM 1960 (to Spring Park & Ride)

The HOV ends approximately one mile (1.6 km) north of the FM 1960 (Cypress Creek Parkway) exit and becomes a diamond white line at grade separated HOV north to just before exit 84 Loop 336 on the south side of Conroe. This provides constant HOV access with one lane on the northbound side and one lane on the southbound side with periodic dotted lines for access at major exits.

=== Julius Schepps Freeway ===
The stretch of I-45 along the Julius Schepps Freeway in Dallas, from the Trinity River to Downtown Dallas up to and including I-345, is elevated above the surrounding areas for most of its length. As such, when ice storms hit the Dallas area (usually on average one to two times per year), the freeway is shut down, and traffic is diverted to SH 310 and US 175, which parallel I-45.

== History ==
In the initial assignment of state highways in 1917, the Dallas–Fort Worth metroplex and Greater Houston were connected by a branch of SH 2 (Meridian Highway), which ran via Waco and Bryan and continued on to Galveston. The more direct route followed by I-45 was not initially part of the system between Richland and Huntsville; this cutoff was added by 1919 as SH 32, and US 75 was assigned to the alignment in 1926. Prior to the coming of the Interstate Highway System in the late 1950s, the only improvements to US 75 in Texas beyond building a two-lane paved roadway were in the Houston and Dallas areas. The highways in and near these cities, however, included some of the first freeways in the state: the Gulf Freeway (Houston) and the Central Expressway (Dallas).

=== Gulf Freeway (Houston to Galveston) ===
The Galveston–Houston Electric Railway began operating an interurban between those cities on December 5, 1911, and last ran on October 31, 1936, though the Houston Electric Company, operator of Houston's city transit system, continued to run trains on the portion between Downtown and Park Place. A proposal for a "superhighway" between the cities was first made in 1930, and Houston Mayor Oscar F. Holcombe began to work toward it later that decade. He announced an agreement with the Houston Electric Company on April 12, 1940, through which the company could convert its four remaining lines to busses in exchange for the right-of-way used by the Park Place line. This line was last used on June 9, 1940, the last day of streetcar service in Houston; the replacement is still operated by the Houston Metro as the 40 along Telephone Road.

Before the new highway was built, US 75 followed Galveston Road (now mostly SH 3), Broadway Street, and Harrisburg Boulevard into Downtown. SH 225 carried traffic from La Porte along La Porte Road to US 75 in Harrisburg, and SH 35 connected Alvin with Downtown along Telephone Road and Leeland Street. Plans made in October 1943, when the Texas Transportation Commission signed an agreement with Houston and Harris County, referred to the new bypass as a relocation of US 75. Drawings were released by the state on January 31, 1946, and included almost continuous frontage roads, broken only at railroad crossings. Although the freeway ended at Live Oak Street, a so-called "four-street distribution system" of four one-way streets, timed for 30 mph (48 km/h), carried traffic to Main Street. Initially, the two southwestern streets—Pierce Street and Calhoun Avenue (now St. Joseph Parkway)—carried traffic toward the freeway, and the other two—Jefferson and Pease streets—carried exiting traffic; once the freeway was completed far enough to allow US 75 to be marked along it, Pease and Pierce streets carried that highway to Fannin Street.

The first freeway dedication in the state took place at 7:00 pm on September 30, 1948, at the overpass over Calhoun Road by the University of Houston. The roadway between Downtown and Telephone Road was opened to traffic after speeches but lacked an official name, being called the "Interurban Expressway", after the rail line that it replaced, by the press. Mayor Holcombe quickly started a contest to assign a name, and the city chose the winning entry on December 17, 1948. Sara Yancy of Houston Heights won $100 (equivalent to $1,340 in 2025) for her submission of "Gulf Freeway", named for the Gulf of Mexico that the highway would reach when completed. The freeway was extended to Griggs Road in February 1951 and Reveille Street (onto which SH 35 was realigned) in July 1951 and was completed to the Galveston Causeway on August 2, 1952, with a ceremony on the bridge over FM 517 near Dickinson. However, beyond Reveille Street, the road was not built to freeway standards, with 32 at-grade intersections, though no traffic signals. The highway curved away from the old interurban right-of-way near Monroe Road, about where the Park Place streetcar line had ended. In December 1952, a short spur, now part of I-610, was opened to connect with SH 225. A three-way split in the northwest part of Park Place, near where Gulfgate Shopping Center opened in 1956, carried nonstop traffic to and from SH 35 and SH 225. This split was also the location of a lane drop; the roadway carried six lanes (three in each direction) between Houston and the interchange and four beyond to Galveston. After the new US 75 was completed, the old road between Downtown and South Houston was dropped from the state highway system, while the remainder became SH 3, connecting to the Gulf Freeway via Winkler Drive, effective August 20, 1952.

The first major change was made in preparation for the North Freeway connection, when the directions of Calhoun Avenue and Jefferson Street were swapped so that they would alternate. A bridge, dated 1954, was built to carry traffic from Jefferson Street over traffic to Jefferson Street, and US 75 was moved to Calhoun Avenue northbound, soon crossing downtown on the one-way pair of Calhoun Avenue and Pierce Street to the new North Freeway. A median barrier was added in 1956 to prevent crossover accidents. Southeast of Downtown, the at-grade intersections proved dangerous, and only two had been replaced with interchanges by 1959, when the Texas Highway Department began a program to upgrade the road to full freeway standards. Frontage roads would be required along the entire highway, since the state had not purchased access rights, and so abutting property owners were able to build driveways to the road. To accomplish this, traffic was shifted to the newly built frontage roads so that the central main lanes could be reconstructed. This grade separation was completed from Houston to Almeda-Genoa Road (exit 34) in June 1959, FM 1959 (exit 30) in October 1964, FM 518 (exit 23) in December 1970, and FM 1764 (exit 15) in 1976. As the section beyond FM 1764 into Galveston had already been rebuilt, this marked the completion of the Gulf Freeway as an actual freeway.

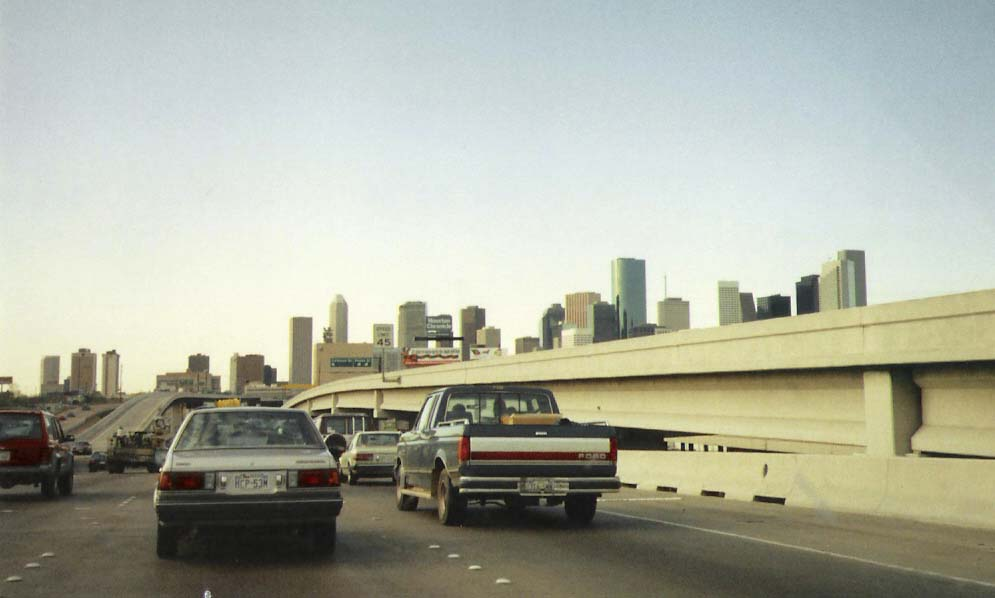
Looking northwest along the Gulf Freeway toward Downtown in 2006; the Spur 5 distributor lanes, completed in 1988, are to the right

As the first freeway in Texas, the standards of the Gulf Freeway soon became inadequate, with poor sight lines and little room to merge when entering. It also attracted development, such as Gulfgate Center, the first mall in the Houston area, the Manned Spacecraft Center, and many residential developments. Heavy congestion began to affect the freeway by the early 1960s; two roughly parallel freeways—the Harrisburg and Alvin freeways—were proposed at that time to relieve the traffic but were not built. A short project to widen the road to six lanes between I-610 and Sims Bayou was completed in 1960, and ramp meters were installed in 1966. The I-610 interchange was rebuilt with direct connections for most movements in 1975. Plans to reconstruct the freeway near Downtown began in 1972, taking about 170 houses and 22 businesses from the southwest side for the room to expand the main lanes and add parallel lanes for the Alvin Freeway. Local opposition was unsuccessful at stopping the project, and construction on this segment, and others to the southeast, took place in the 1980s. The lanes were shifted outward to make room for the transitway, which opened to I-610 on May 16, 1988. These lanes were inspired by the similar ones on the Henry G. Shirley Memorial Highway in the Washington metropolitan area. That year also marked the end of the reconstruction inside I-610, along with the elevated distribution lanes alongside the mainlanes near Downtown; the first short piece of the Alvin Freeway was finally connected to these in 1999. This project gave I-45 its current configuration, mostly eight mainlanes wide, from Sims Bayou past I-610 to Griggs Road in 1981, to Telephone Road in 1982, to Lockwood Drive in 1985, and, finally, to Downtown in 1988.

These projects, however, were not the end of construction on the Gulf Freeway. The highway beyond I-610 to FM 1959, which had just been upgraded in the 1950s and 1960s, saw an extension of the transitway to a temporary end near FM 1959, widening to eight lanes, and a large stack interchange at the Sam Houston Tollway. This reconstruction was completed between Almeda-Genoa Road and College Avenue in 1991, between College Avenue and Sims Bayou in 1994, and, finally in 1997, there was no construction anywhere on the entire length of the freeway when the tollway interchange was opened, along with the widening between Almeda-Genoa Road and FM 1959. A 1999 study recommended widening the entire stretch from the Sam Houston Tollway to Galveston to at least eight lanes. Construction to replace the Galveston Causeway began in mid-2003, and work on a section through Webster, including a new interchange with NASA Road 1, began in mid-2007.

Widening of the freeway between Kurland Drive at Bay Area Boulevard began in July 2011. This construction will expand the number of freeway lanes from six to ten and increase the number of frontage lanes from four to six. The HOV lane will be extended to the southern end of the construction. It will also involve rebuilding the overpasses at Dixie Farm Road and Clear Lake City Boulevard. (Dixie Farm Road bridge demolition has already been completed.) According to TxDOT, the project is approximately 15 miles (24 km) in length, starting at Kurland and ending approximately one mile (1.6 km) south of Bay Area Boulevard.

The project has six phases. Phase one is the reconstruction of the mainlanes from the northern end of the project to just south of FM 1959. The end of this phase will include the demolition and reconstruction of the bridge at the FM 1959 intersection. Phase two, planned to begin in mid-2012, will be the reconstruction of the frontage roads from just south of FM 1959 to the southern end of the project. Phase three will be the reconstruction of the mainlanes on the southern half of the project and is planned to begin in mid-2013. Phase four, scheduled to start late 2014, will be the demolition and reconstruction of the overpass at Clear Lake City Boulevard. Phase five (which was completed) was the demolition and reconstruction of El Dorado and Bay Area boulevards. The demolition and reconstruction was finished in 2016. As a result, the 1960s-era cloverleaf interchanges (with the exception of Fuqua Street and Scarsdale Boulevard) have been eliminated with overpasses. Phase six will be making the new lanes of the freeway. It will have five lanes each direction along with the new overpasses for those two underpasses. This will be completed 2017.

In 2015, reconstruction and widening of I-45 began in Downtown due to heavy traffic. The southbound onramp from Allen Parkway will be moved to enter on the right side, and long-range plans call for the demolition of the outdated Pierce Elevated, with the reroute of I-45 being along I-69/US 59 and I-10/US 90 to the North Freeway. The parts of the Gulf Freeway at I-10 and I-45 will be known as the Downtown Connector. If I-45 was rerouted and the Pierce Elevated demolished (and/or redeveloped into the proposed Pierce SkyPark as part of additional greenspace), the connecting ramps south of Allen Parkway would become a second downtown spur, which will result in the demise of a full freeway loop around Downtown. As of 2018, there are no plans to place the Pierce Elevated in a tunnel similar to Spur 366 in Dallas since Greater Houston is prone to flooding, especially in the aftermath of Hurricane Harvey.

=== North Freeway (Houston to Conroe) ===
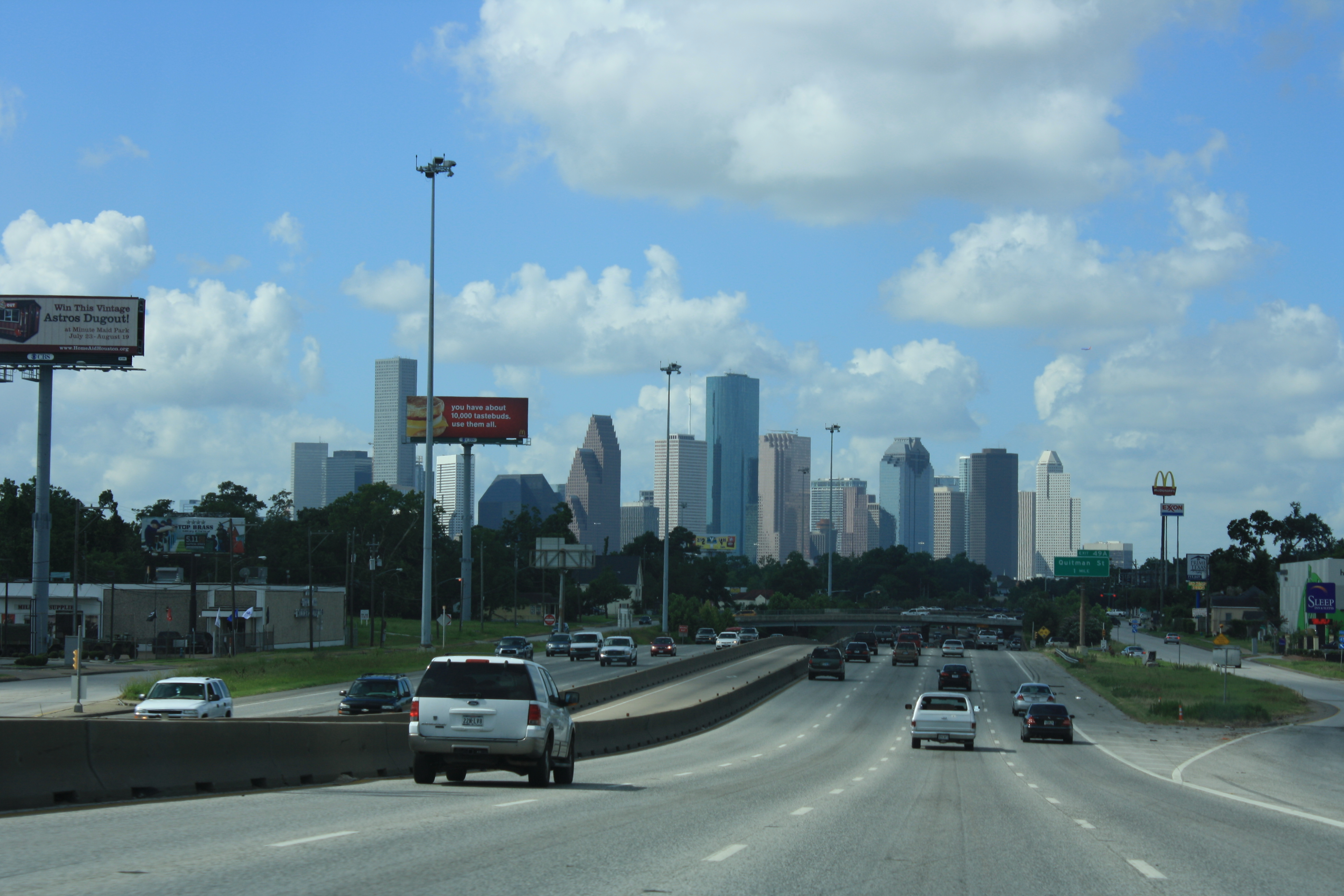
Southbound on the North Freeway

The last alignment of US 75 before the North Freeway was built left Downtown to the northwest on Main Street, turning north at Airline Drive, and then northwest along the present alignment of I-45, then known as Stuebner Airline Road, Shepherd Drive, and East Montgomery Road. The freeway replacement was authorized in stages between May 1945 and June 1952, when the Texas Transportation Commission adopted plans for a freeway all the way between Houston and Dallas. The North Freeway name was adopted in 1956; an unsuccessful proposal in 1965 would have renamed it the Dallas Freeway. The first short piece of the freeway to open crossed Buffalo Bayou, connecting the two one-way pairs from the north end of the Gulf Freeway with the south end of Houston Avenue. This section was opened on December 12, 1955, and allowed US 75 to bypass its run on Main Street; it included interchanges with Allen Parkway and Memorial Drive. The next piece near downtown opened on July 24, 1962, leaving the 1955 freeway in the Allen Parkway interchange, passing east of Houston Avenue, and connected to an already-built portion at I-610. The six-lane Pierce Elevated, which occupies half a block on the southwest side of Pierce Street, required the acquisition of a number of commercial properties; the cost prevented the full block from being used. This portion opened on August 18, 1967, connecting the Gulf and North Freeways and bypassing the "four-street distribution system", which remains in its original form to this day.

The first piece of the North Freeway to be built outside I-610 was an upgrade of existing US 75 on Stuebner Airline Road, between Airline and Shepherd drives, opened in December 1959. In April 1961, this was completed to the interchange with I-610, and, on July 24, 1962, the Downtown section was extended north to meet it. As each section opened, US 75 was moved to it, temporarily using I-610 to Airline Drive for about a year. At the other end, US 75 was upgraded from Spring Creek at the north edge of Spring north to the San Jacinto River south of Conroe in 1960. In between, the upgrade was completed from FM 525 to near Richey Road in December 1961, south to the 1959 segment in February 1963, and north to the 1960 segment in March 1963, completing the North Freeway except for the Pierce Elevated (1967). The freeway as initially built had eight lanes (four in each direction) between Downtown and I-610, six to FM 1960, and four north of FM 1960.

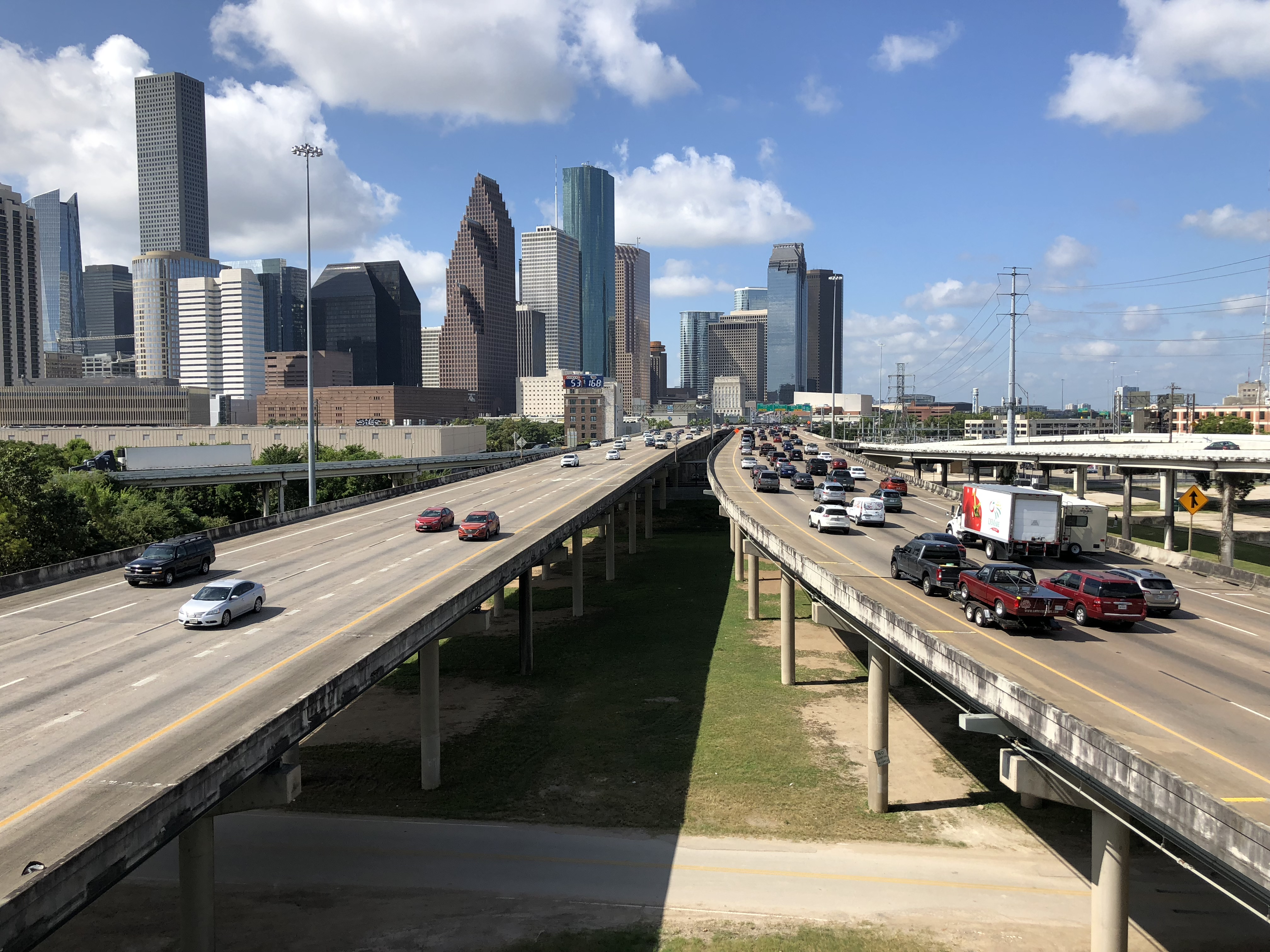
Southbound I-45 entering Downtown

Like the Gulf Freeway, the North Freeway soon became congested. The oil boom of the 1970s resulted in large-scale residential development along the highway, most notably The Woodlands. Since the corridor was strongly directional, with 65 percent of peak-hour traffic going in the peak direction, a 9.6-mile (15.4 km) contraflow lane for busses and other HOVs was implemented later that decade, opening on August 28, 1979, between Downtown and Shepherd Drive (exit 56B). The facility, operating during both rush-hour periods, occupied the leftmost lane of the other direction and was separated from the other lanes with a movable pylon every 40 feet (12 m). In 1980, the existing center breakdown lanes were restriped for HOV traffic for about two miles (3.2 km) from the north end of the contraflow lane. Off-peak traffic, however, was increasing, and construction began in 1983 on a more permanent reversible transitway in the median. Thus, the second transitway in Houston (a month after the one on the Katy Freeway), opened on November 23, 1984, replacing the contraflow lane.

Reconstruction of the mainlanes and frontage roads to handle increased traffic began in 1982 just north of Downtown. No lanes were added south of I-610, but the eight-lane cross-section, with room for a transitway, was continued north as construction progressed. Work was completed south of Airline Drive (exit 53) in about 1985, to Shepherd Drive (exit 56B) in 1987, and to FM 525 (exit 60A) in 1990; this last opening allowed the transitway to extend to just south of FM 525. The Hardy Toll Road, completed on June 28, 1988, between I-610 and I-45 near The Woodlands, added capacity to that part of the corridor, and, in 1990, reconstruction was completed on a short piece of I-45 from the toll road into The Woodlands. Reconstruction continued from FM 525, reaching Airtex Boulevard (exit 63) in 1997, including part of the Sam Houston Tollway interchange (completed in 2003) and a transitway extension, Cypresswood Drive (exit 68) in 1998, extending the transit way to its present terminus, and the Hardy Toll Road (exit 72) in 2003. Work on the section through The Woodlands to Research Forest Drive (exit 77) was completed in 2001, including a direct connection to Woodlands Parkway, and, in 2003, work was completed to FM 1488 (exit 81). Construction is now complete between FM 1488 to the Walker County line near milepost 100 just south of the northbound truck weigh station and New Waverly, near SH 75 (exit 98).

As of 2015, widening of the North Freeway from Downtown to the Sam Houston Tollway began. The plan for the project is to widen the freeway by adding managed lanes and adding the North Shepherd on- and offramps also known as Spur 261 (which was already completed) prior to the I-45 widening project. This project has generated major controversy, with proponents claiming it would "enhance safety and mobility", while opponents point out that it would worsen air quality and greenhouse gas emissions, displace hundreds of people, and fail to meaningfully address congestion.

Authorities in Harris County have sued TxDOT to stop the expansion, and the federal government has investigated the expansion project to determine whether it violates any civil rights or environmental laws. Among others, the expansion has been opposed by U.S. Representative Sheila Jackson Lee and Harris County Judge Lina Hidalgo. If completed, the highway's width will double to 480 feet (150 m), wider than a football field. Portions are planned to be buried. The highway expansion would displace around a thousand residents, including 919 units in 16 apartment complexes, 160 single-family homes, five places of worship, and two schools. An apartment complex was acquired and vacated by TxDOT, which plans to demolish it for the expansion. TxDOT was heavily criticized for this planned demolition, as the apartment complex slated for demolition had been described as an example of good urban planning.

Parts of the freeway are paralleled by the METRORail Red Line.

=== Between Conroe and Richland ===
The first part of I-45 between Conroe and Richland was the bypass around Huntsville.

The final piece of I-45 between the cities opened on October 13, 1971, for 12 miles (19 km) between Fairfield and Streetman.

=== Richland to Dallas (Julius Schepps Freeway) ===
The Central Expressway was the first freeway in Dallas, built as a new alignment of US 75. It first opened between San Jacinto Street and Fitzhugh Avenue in 1949 and soon stretched south to Hutchins. The stretch through downtown, however, ran along the surface, as did the part south of the bridge over the Trinity River, due to diversion of funds to the north portion. By the late 1950s, a bypass to the east of the downtown section was planned. By the time construction reached Hutchins, in about 1955, the state decided to build further segments to full freeway standards. By 1961, the freeway was complete between Hutchins and the SH 14 split at Richland, except for the bypass around Corsicana, which was built c. 1964. This freeway was mostly built along the existing US 75; one of the projects in Navarro County, near Corsicana, was the first Interstate project in Texas approved under the Federal-Aid Highway Act of 1956.

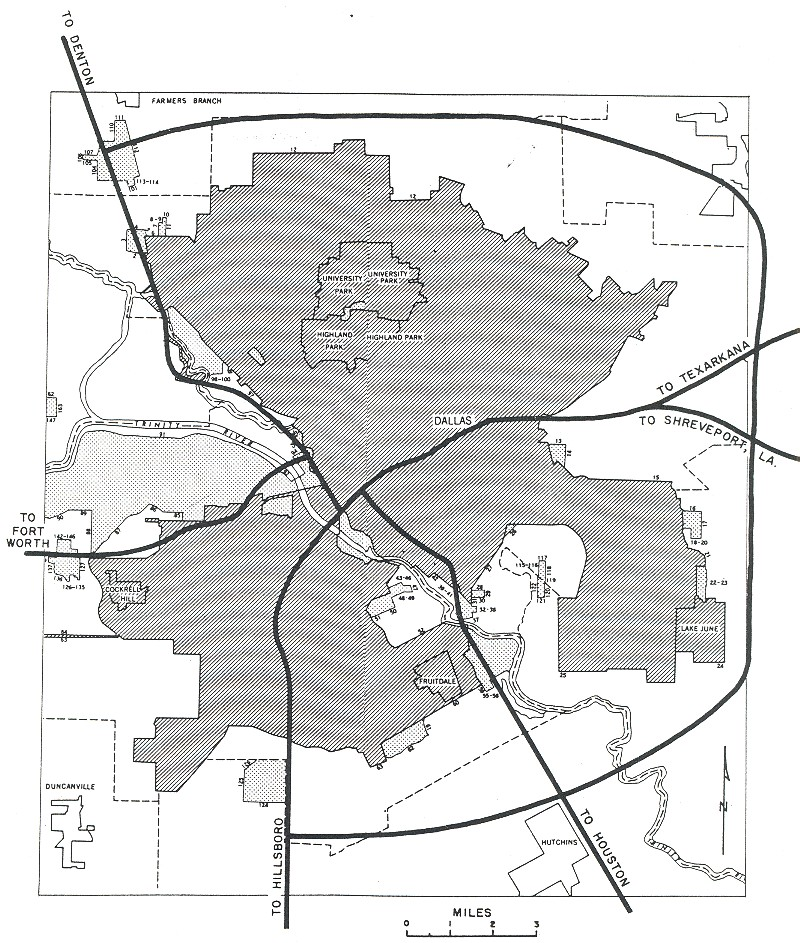
1955 "Yellow Book" plan for Interstates in Dallas

It was not until 1964 that I-345, extending I-45 north along the proposed Central Expressway bypass, was added as a proposed state highway. I-45 and I-345 were built and opened in the 1970s, with the final section, between Lamar Street (exit 283A) and the Central Expressway (exit 283B), opening on February 25, 1976. At the north end, before it merged into the Central Expressway (which continued to carry US 75), I-345 straddled the bridges over Bryan Street and Ross Avenue, the latter the location of the opening ceremonies in 1949. Because of their location, these two bridges were not replaced in the 1990s reconstruction of the North Central Expressway and are the only surviving grade separations from the initial construction north from downtown.

At the time the interchange with I-20 was built, the freeway that crossed I-45 was then a part of I-635; it would not be until later when, initially, I-20 was added to I-635 as a multiplex, then later still, I-635 would be truncated away from the I-45 interchange (back around to just north of what is now I-20's interchange with US 175).

Reconstruction and widening to six lanes, from the Ellis–Navarro county line (between exits 243 and 244) north to SH 310 (exit 275), began in 1991. The last section, near the north end, was completed in 2002.

== Exit list ==
County	Location	mi	km	Exit	Destinations	Notes
Galveston	Galveston	0.00	0.00		SH 87 north (Broadway Avenue J) – Downtown, East Beach	Continuation north
Galveston	Galveston	0.00	0.00	1A	Spur 342 (61st Street) / 71st Street – Scholes Airport, West Beach	
Galveston	Galveston	1.0	1.6	1B	71st Street	Southbound exit and northbound entrance; northbound access via exit 1A
Galveston	Galveston	1.1	1.8	1C	FM 188 (Teichman Road) / SH 275 (Harborside Drive)	
Galveston	Galveston Bay	2.7– 4.3	4.3– 6.9	Galveston Causeway		
Galveston		4.2	6.8	4	Village of Tiki Island	
Galveston		5.2	8.4	5	Frontage Road	
Galveston	La Marque	6.2	10.0	6	Frontage Road	Southbound access only
Galveston	La Marque	6.7	10.8	7A	SH 3 north / SH 146 north / Spur 197 north – Texas City, La Marque	Northbound exit and southbound entrance
Galveston	La Marque	7.0	11.3	7B	SH 6 west – Bayou Vista, Hitchcock	Southbound entrance only
Galveston	La Marque	8.2	13.2	7	SH 6 / SH 146 – Texas City	Southbound exit and northbound entrance
Galveston	La Marque	9.0	14.5	8	Frontage Road	Southbound entrance only; northbound exit is via exit 10
Galveston	La Marque	9.7	15.6	9	Frontage Road	Southbound exit and northbound entrance
Galveston	La Marque	10.1	16.3	10	FM 519 (Main Street)	
Galveston	La Marque	11.1	17.9	11	Vauthier Road	
Galveston	Texas City	12.2	19.6	12	FM 1765 – La Marque	
Galveston	Texas City	13.2	21.2	13	Century Boulevard, Delany Road	
Galveston	Texas City	14.7	23.7	15	FM 1764 / FM 2004 (Mall of the Mainland Parkway) – Hitchcock	Northbound exit and southbound entrance
Galveston	Texas City	15.7	25.3	16	FM 1764 east – Texas City	Southbound exit and northbound entrance; access to Mainland Medical Center
Galveston	Texas City	17.0	27.4	17	Holland Road, Hughes Road	
Galveston	Dickinson	18.9	30.4	19	FM 517 / Hughes Road – Dickinson, Alvin	
Galveston	League City	20.0	32.2	20	FM 646 (16th Street) – Santa Fe	Interchange is planned to become the SH 99 (Grand Parkway) interchange; no northbound exit, northbound exit is via exit 22
Galveston	League City	22.0	35.4	22	SH 96 / League City Parkway	
Galveston	League City	22.7	36.5	23	FM 518 (West Main Street) – League City	
Harris	Webster				I-45 Express Lane	Southern end of Express Lane; southbound entrance only
Harris	Webster	25.0	40.2	24	NASA 1 – NASA	Southbound exit and northbound entrance; access to Houston Methodist St. John Hospital
Harris	Webster	24.3	39.1	25	FM 528 (NASA Parkway) / NASA 1 – Alvin, NASA	Northbound exit for NASA Road 1 via frontage road, access to Houston Methodist St. John Hospital
Harris	Webster	25.7	41.4	26	Bay Area Boulevard – University of Houston–Clear Lake	Access to Clear Lake Regional Medical Center
Harris	Webster			—	I-45 Express Lane north	Northbound exit only
Harris	Webster	26.8	43.1	27	El Dorado Boulevard	
Harris	Houston	28.0	45.1	29	FM 2351 (Clear Lake City Boulevard) – Friendswood	
Harris	Houston	29.4	47.3	—	FM 1959 (Dixie Farm Road)	Southbound right exit and northbound right entrance for reversible Express Lane only
Harris	Houston	29.4	47.3	30	FM 1959 (Dixie Farm Road) – Ellington Field	
Harris	Houston	30.9	49.7	31	Beltway 8 (Frontage Road) / FM 2553 (Scarsdale Boulevard)	Northbound exit and southbound entrance
Harris	Houston			—	Southpoint Park & Ride	Southbound exit and northbound right entrance for reversible Express Lane only
Harris	Houston			—	Fuqua Park & Ride	Southbound right exit and northbound entrance for reversible Express Lane only
Harris	Houston	32.0	51.5	32	Sam Houston Tollway	
Harris	Houston	32.7	52.6	33	Beltway 8 (Frontage Road) / Fuqua Street	Southbound exit and northbound entrance
Harris	Houston	33.6	54.1	34	Almeda–Genoa Road / South Shaver Road	
Harris	Houston	34.8	56.0	35	Clearwood Drive, Edgebrook Drive	
Harris	Houston	35.9	57.8	36	Airport Boulevard, College Avenue	
Harris	Houston			—	Hobby Airport	Access from reversible Express Lane only
Harris	Houston			—	Monroe Park & Ride	Access from reversible Express Lane only
Harris	Houston	37.0	59.5	38	SH 3 (Monroe Road) / Winkler Drive / Bellfort Avenue / Howard Drive	
Harris	Houston	38.7	62.3	38B	Howard Drive, Bellfort Avenue	Southbound exit and northbound entrance
Harris	Houston	38.9	62.6	39	Park Place Boulevard, Broadway Boulevard	
Harris	Houston	40.1	64.5	40A	Frontage Road	Northbound exit only
Harris	Houston	40.3	64.9	40B	I-610 west (South Loop Freeway west) / SH 35 south (Reveille Street) – Pearland, Alvin I-610 east (South Loop Freeway east) to SH 225 – Pasadena	I-610 exit 32; I-610 west/SH 35 not signed northbound
Harris	Houston	40.4	65.0	40C	I-610 west (South Loop Freeway)	Left exit northbound; southbound access via exit 40B; I-610 exit 32A
Harris	Houston			—	I-610	Access via frontage roads from Reversible Express Lane only
Harris	Houston	40.6	65.3	41A	Woodridge Drive	
Harris	Houston	41.7	67.1	41B	Griggs Road, Broad Street	
Harris	Houston	42.6	68.6	42	US 90 Alt. (South Wayside Drive)	Northbound access via exit 41B
Harris	Houston	42.7	68.7	43A	Telephone Road	
Harris	Houston	43.1	69.4	43B	Tellepsen Street	
Harris	Houston	43.8	70.5	44A	Elgin-Lockwood, Cullen Boulevard – University of Houston	Northbound exit and southbound entrance
Harris	Houston			—	Eastwood Transit Center, Emancipation Avenue	Northern end of reversible Express Lane; northbound exit and southbound entrance
Harris	Houston	44.3	71.3	44B	Spur 5 south – University of Houston	Southbound exit only
Harris	Houston	44.6	71.8	44C	Cullen Boulevard, Lockwood-Elgin – University of Houston	Southbound exit and northbound entrance
Harris	Houston	44.0	70.8	45	SH 288 south – Lake Jackson, Freeport, Houston Zoo I-69 / US 59 – Cleveland, Victoria	Northbound exit and southbound entrance; I-69 exit 129A northbound, 129B southbound
Harris	Houston	44.0	70.8	45A	Scott Street	Northbound access via exit 45
Harris	Houston			46	Saint Joseph Parkway, Pease Street, Emancipation Avenue – Downtown Destinations	Northbound exit only; Saint Joseph Parkway and Emancipation Avenue were formerly Calhoun Avenue and Dowling Street, respectively
Harris	Houston	45.8	73.7	46A	I-69 north / US 59 north – Cleveland	Southbound left exit and northbound entrance; I-69 exit 129B southbound.
Harris	Houston	45.9	73.9	46B	SH 288 south – Lake Jackson, Freeport, Houston Zoo I-69 south / US 59 south – Victoria	Southbound exit and northbound left entrance; I-69 exit 129A northbound
Harris	Houston	47.5	76.4	47B	Houston Avenue / Memorial Drive – Amtrak Station	Northbound exit only
Harris	Houston	47.5	76.4	47A	Allen Parkway	Left exits
Harris	Houston	47.8	76.9	47C	McKinney Street	Southbound left exit and northbound entrance
Harris	Houston	47.9	77.1	47D	Dallas Street / Pierce Street	Southbound exit and northbound entrance
Harris	Houston			—	Smith Street / Milam Street	Southern end of reversible Express Lane; southbound exit and northbound entrance; mainline I-45 access to Milam Street via exit 48A southbound
Harris	Houston	48.3	77.7	48A	I-10 east (US 90 east) – Beaumont	Left exit southbound; I-10 exit 768
Harris	Houston			—	I-10 west (US 90 west) / Quitman Street	Southbound exit and northbound right entrance for reversible Express Lane only; I-10 exit 768A
Harris	Houston	48.6	78.2	48B	I-10 west (US 90 west) – San Antonio	Left exit northbound; I-10 exits 768
Harris	Houston	49.2	79.2	49A	Quitman Street	Southbound exit and northbound entrance
Harris	Houston	49.7	80.0	49B	North Main Street, Houston Avenue	
Harris	Houston	50.2	80.8	50A	Patton Street	Southbound exit is via exit 50
Harris	Houston	50.8	81.8	50B	Cavalcade Street, Link Road, Patton Street	Signed as exit 50 southbound; Link Road not signed southbound; Patton Street not signed northbound
Harris	Houston	51.4	82.7	51	I-610 (North Loop Freeway) to Hardy Toll Road	I-610 exits 17B-C; access to Hardy Toll Road via I-610 east
Harris	Houston			—	Airline Drive to I-610	Access from Reversible Express Lane only
Harris	Houston	52.5	84.5	52A	Frontage Road	Southbound exit only
Harris	Houston	52.3	84.2	52B	Crosstimbers Road	
Harris	Houston	52.8	85.0	53	Airline Drive	
Harris	Houston	53.2	85.6	54	Tidwell Road	
Harris	Houston	54.2	87.2	55A	Parker Road, Yale Street	
Harris	Houston	55.4	89.2	55B	Little York Road	Northbound exit and southbound entrance
Harris	Houston	56.5	90.9	56A	Spur 261 (Shepherd Drive)	No northbound exit
Harris	Houston	56.6	91.1	56B	Veterans Memorial Drive / Little York Road	Southbound exit and entrance only
Harris	Houston	57.4	92.4	57A	Gulf Bank Road	Northbound exit was formerly signed exit 56A for Canino Road
Harris	Houston			—	North Shepherd Drive (Spur 261)	Northbound right exit and southbound entrance for Reversible Express Lane only
Harris	Houston	57.5	92.5	57B	SH 249 (West Mount Houston Road) – Tomball	Former FM 149
Harris	Houston	58.3	93.8	59	West Road	
Harris	Houston			—	To Sam Houston Tollway / Beltway 8 – George Bush Intercontinental Airport	Northbound right exit and southbound right entrance for Reversible Express Lane only; access via frontage roads
Harris	Houston	59.3	95.4	60A	FM 525 (Aldine Bender Road) / Fallbrook Road / Beltway 8 (Frontage Road)	Beltway 8/Frontage Road not signed northbound
Harris	Houston	60.2	96.9	60B	Beltway 8 (Frontage Road)	Southbound access via exit 60A
Harris	Houston	60.4– 60.5	97.2– 97.4	60C-D	Beltway 8 east (Sam Houston Parkway) / Sam Houston Tollway west – George Bush Intercontinental Airport	Signed as exits 60C (Sam Houston Tollway) and 60D (Beltway 8) northbound; signed as exit 60B southbound
Harris	Houston	60.8	97.8	61	Greens Road	
Harris	Houston	61.7	99.3	62	Rankin Road, Kuykendahl Road	
Harris	Houston			—	Kuykendahl Park & Ride	Access from reversible Express Lane only
Harris	Houston	62.9	101.2	63	Airtex Drive	
Harris	Houston	64.6	104.0	64	Richey Road	
Harris	Houston	65.7	105.7	66A	FM 1960 – Humble	Signed as exit 66 southbound; access to Houston Northwest Medical Center
Harris	Houston	65.7	105.7	—	FM 1960	Northbound right exit and southbound right entrance for reversible Express Lane only
Harris	Houston	66.8	107.5	66B	Hollow Tree Lane, Parramatta Lane	Northbound exit and southbound entrance
Harris	Houston			—	I-45 Express Lane south	Northern end of Reversible Express Lane
Harris	Houston	68.3	109.9	68	Cypresswood Drive, Holzwarth Road, Louetta Road	Louetta Road not signed northbound
Harris	Houston–Spring line	69.0	111.0	70A	FM 2920 – Tomball	
Harris	Spring	70.4– 71.5	113.3– 115.1	70B	SH 99 Toll (Grand Parkway) / Spring Stuebner Road	Signed as exit 71A southbound; Spring Stuebner Road signed northbound only
Harris	Spring	71.7– 72.5	115.4– 116.7	72	To Hardy Toll Road south / Springwoods Village Parkway	Northbound exit and southbound entrance; southbound access to Springwoods Village Parkway (formerly Spring Crossing Drive) via exit 72A
Harris–Montgomery county line	Spring	71.7– 72.5	115.4– 116.7	72B	Hardy Toll Road south	Drivers using this exit must pay toll; southbound exit and northbound entrance
Montgomery	Rayford	71.7– 72.5	115.4– 116.7	72A	To SH 99 Toll east (Grand Parkway)	Southbound exit and northbound entrance
Montgomery	Rayford	73.3	118.0	73	Rayford Road, Sawdust Road	
Montgomery	The Woodlands	74.3– 75.6	119.6– 121.7	76	Robinson Road, Woodlands Parkway	Signed as exits 76A (Robinson Road) and 76B (Woodlands Parkway) northbound
Montgomery	The Woodlands	76.2	122.6	77	Lake Woodlands Drive, Research Forest Drive, Tamina Road	Access to Memorial Hermann The Woodlands Hospital; Lake Woodlands Drive not signed southbound (access via exit 76 from I-45 southbound)
Montgomery	The Woodlands	77.9– 79.1	125.4– 127.3	79	SH 242 (College Park Drive) / Needham Road	Signed as exits 79A (east) and 79B (west, a former toll ramp) northbound; access to St. Luke's Health - The Woodlands Hospital and Houston Methodist The Woodlands Hospital
Montgomery	Conroe	81.0	130.4	81	FM 1488 – Magnolia, Hempstead	
Montgomery	Conroe	81.9	131.8	82	River Plantation Drive	Northbound exit only, southbound exit is via exit 83
Montgomery	Conroe	83.2	133.9	83	Grand Central Parkway, Crighton Road	Exit formerly co-signed with Camp Strake Road
Montgomery	Conroe	83.9	135.0	84	SH 75 north (Frazier Street) / Loop 336	Signed as exit 84B northbound, access to Conroe Regional Medical Center
Montgomery	Conroe	84.9	136.6	85	Gladstell Street	Access to Conroe Regional Medical Center
Montgomery	Conroe	85.9	138.2	87A	SH 105 / FM 2854 – Conroe, Lake Conroe	Signed as exit 87 southbound, access to Conroe Regional Medical Center, downtown Conroe
Montgomery	Conroe	87.2	140.3	87B	Wilson Road	Northbound exit only; southbound access via exit 88
Montgomery	Conroe	88.0	141.6	88	Loop 336 – Navasota, Cleveland	
Montgomery	Conroe	88.9	143.1	89	FM 3083 (Teas Nursery Road)	
Montgomery	Conroe	90.1	145.0	90	League Line Road	
Montgomery		92.1	148.2	92	FM 830 (Seven Coves Drive)	
Montgomery	Willis	94.4	151.9	94	FM 1097 (W. Montgomery Street) – Willis, Lake Conroe	
Montgomery	Willis	95.1	153.0	95	Longstreet Road	Northbound exit and southbound entrance
Montgomery		96.7	155.6	97	Calvary Road	
Montgomery		98.0	157.7	98	SH 75 / Shepard Hill Road / Old Danville Road	SH 75 not signed southbound
Walker	New Waverly	102.4	164.8	102	SH 150 / FM 1374 / FM 1375 – New Waverly	Southbound exit ramp closed; formerly signed as exit 103 southbound
Walker		109.9	176.9	109	PR 40 – Huntsville State Park	
Walker	Huntsville	112.3	180.7	112	SH 75 – Sam Houston State University	
Walker	Huntsville	112.7	181.4	113	SH 19 – Riverside, Crockett, Lake Livingston	Northbound exit and southbound entrance
Walker	Huntsville	113.5	182.7	114	FM 1374 (Montgomery Road) – Sam Houston State University	Access to Huntsville Memorial Hospital
Walker	Huntsville	115.1	185.2	115	Avenue S	
Walker	Huntsville	116.0	186.7	116	US 190 east (11th Street) / SH 30 / Future I-14 east – Huntsville, College Station, Livingston, Lake Livingston	Southern end of US 190 overlap
Walker	Huntsville	117.0	188.3	117	Frontage Road	No southbound exit
Walker		118.0	189.9	118	SH 75 / FM 1791 – Sam Houston State University, Huntsville, Huntsville Regional Airport	
Walker		122.9	197.8	123	FM 1696	
Walker		132.3	212.9	132	FM 2989	
Madison		136.8	220.2	136	Spur 67	
Madison	Madisonville	141.8	228.2	142	US 190 west / SH 21 west (E Main Street) / Future I-14 west – Bryan, Crockett	Northern end of US 190 overlap
Madison		146.1	235.1	146	SH 75 – Madisonville	
Madison		152.2	244.9	152	SH OSR (Old San Antonio Road) – Normangee	
Leon		156.2	251.4	156	FM 977 – Leona	
Leon	Centerville	163.9	263.8	164	SH 7 (St Marys Street) – Centerville	
Leon	Buffalo	178.5	287.3	178	US 79 – Buffalo, Palestine, Jacksonville	
Leon		179.9	289.5	180	SH 164 – Groesbeck	
Freestone		189.7	305.3	189	SH 179 – Teague	
Freestone	Fairfield	198.0	318.7	197	US 84 – Fairfield, Teague	
Freestone	Fairfield	198.8	319.9	198	FM 27 – Fairfield, Wortham	Access to East Texas Medical Center-Fairfield
Freestone		206.2	331.8	206	FM 833	
Freestone		211.4	340.2	211	FM 80 – Streetman, Kirvin	
Navarro		213.4	343.4	213	SH 75 / FM 246 – Streetman, Wortham	
Navarro		218.7	352.0	218	FM 1394 – Richland	Northbound exit and southbound entrance
Navarro		219.8	353.7	219A	SH 14 – Richland, Mexia	No northbound exit
Navarro		219.9	353.9	219B	Frontage Road	Southbound exit and northbound entrance
Navarro		220.2	354.4	220	Frontage Road	
Navarro	Angus	221.3	356.1	221	Frontage Road	
Navarro	Angus	224.8	361.8	225	FM 739 – Angus, Mustang	
Navarro	Corsicana			227	SH 31 – Athens, Waco	
Navarro	Corsicana	228.5	367.7	228A	15th Street	Southbound exit is via exit 228B
Navarro	Corsicana	229.0	368.5	228B	I-45 BL north / Frontage Road – Corsicana	Left exit northbound
Navarro	Corsicana	229.2	368.9	229	US 287 south – Palestine, Airport	Southern end of US 287 overlap
Navarro	Corsicana	231.3	372.2	231	Bus. SH 31 – Waco, Athens	Access to Navarro Regional Hospital
Navarro	Corsicana	232.7	374.5	232	FM 3041 (Roane Road) / E. 5th Street	
Navarro		235.2	378.5	235A	Frontage Road	Signed as exit 235 northbound
Navarro		235.7	379.3	235B	I-45 BL south – Corsicana	No northbound exit
Navarro	Rice	237.3	381.9	237	Frontage Road	
Navarro	Rice	238.7	384.2	238	FM 1603	
Navarro	Rice	240.1	386.4	239	FM 1126	
Navarro	Rice	242.2	389.8	242	Calhoun Street – Rice	
Navarro	Rice	243.1	391.2	243	Frontage Road	
Ellis		244.1	392.8	244	FM 1182	
Ellis	Alma	246.2	396.2	246	FM 1183 – Alma	
Ellis		257.6	414.6	247	US 287 north – Waxahachie, Fort Worth	Northern end of US 287 overlap
Ellis	Ennis	249.2	401.0	249	I-45 BL north / FM 85 – Ennis	
Ellis	Ennis	251.0	403.9	251A	FM 1181 (Creechville Road)	
Ellis	Ennis	251.7	405.1	251B	SH 34 – Kaufman, Italy	
Ellis	Ennis	253.3	407.6	253	I-45 BL south – Ennis	
Ellis		255.0	410.4	255	FM 879 – Garrett	
Ellis	Palmer	258.1	415.4	258	I-45 BL north / Parker Hill Road – Palmer	
Ellis	Palmer	258.6	416.2	259	FM 813 (Jefferson Street)	
Ellis	Palmer	259.6	417.8	260	I-45 BL south / Frontage Road – Palmer	
Ellis		262.3	422.1	262	Frontage Road	
Ellis		263.0	423.3	263A	Loop 561 – Trumbull	
Ellis		263.7	424.4	263B	Frontage Road	Northbound exit and southbound entrance
Ellis		266.1	428.2	264	Frontage Road	Southbound exit and northbound entrance
Ellis		264.8	426.2	265	I-45 BL north	Northbound exit and southbound entrance
Ellis	Ferris	265.4	427.1	266	FM 660 (5th Street)	
Ellis	Ferris	266.8	429.4	267	Frontage Road	No southbound entrance
Dallas		268.3	431.8	268	I-45 BL south / Malloy Bridge Road Loop 9 west – Red Oak, Lancaster	
Dallas		269.4	433.6	269	Mars Road	
Dallas	Wilmer	270.4	435.2	270	Belt Line Road	
Dallas	Wilmer	271.7	437.3	271	Pleasant Run Road	
Dallas	Hutchins	272.7	438.9	272	Fulghum Road	
Dallas	Hutchins	273.5	440.2	273	Wintergreen Road	
Dallas	Hutchins	274.7	442.1	274	Dowdy Ferry Road, Palestine Street	
Dallas	Hutchins	275.9	444.0	275	SH 310 north	Northbound exit and southbound entrance
Dallas	Dallas	276.1– 276.3	444.3– 444.7	276	I-20 – Fort Worth, Shreveport	Signed as exits 276A (west) and 276B (east); I-20 exits 473B-C
Dallas	Dallas	278.0	447.4	277	Simpson Stuart Road	
Dallas	Dallas	279.3– 279.5	449.5– 449.8	279	Loop 12	Signed as exits 279A (east) and 279B (west) northbound
Dallas	Dallas	280.1	450.8	280	Illinois Avenue, Linfield Street	
Dallas	Dallas	281.4	452.9	281	Overton Road	Southbound exit and northbound entrance
Dallas	Dallas	282.1	454.0	282	US 175 east – Kaufman	Southbound exit and northbound entrance
Dallas	Dallas	283.1– 283.3	455.6– 455.9	283A	Lamar Street, Pennsylvania Avenue – Fair Park	Northbound exit and southbound entrance
Dallas	Dallas	284.4	457.7	283B	Al Lipscomb Way, S.M. Wright Freeway (SH 310 south) / Martin Luther King Jr. Boulevard – Fair Park	Al Lipscomb Way: Northbound exit and southbound entrance SH 310 south and Martin Luther King Jr. Boulevard: Southbound exit and northbound entrance
Dallas	Dallas	284.9	458.5	284A	I-30 (US 67)	I-30 exits 46-47B
Dallas	Dallas	284.9	458.5		To US 75 north – McKinney	Northern terminus; access via unsigned I-345
1.000 mi = 1.609 km; 1.000 km = 0.621 mi: Closed/former; Concurrency terminus; Electronic toll collection; HOV only; Incomplete access

== Related routes ==
- Interstate 345
- Texas State Highway 3
- Texas State Highway 75
- Texas State Highway 310
- U.S. Route 75 in Texas
- U.S. Route 175
- Business routes of Interstate 45
