= Mustang, Texas =

- Town
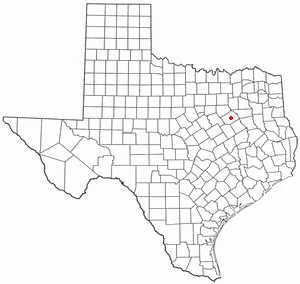
- Location of Mustang, Texas

- Coordinates: 32°00′49″N 96°25′49″W
- Country: United States
- State: Texas
- County: Navarro

Area
  - Total: 0.12 sq mi (0.32 km^{2})
  - Land: 0.12 sq mi (0.32 km^{2})
  - Water: 0.0039 sq mi (0.01 km^{2})
- Elevation: 397 ft (121 m)

Population (2020)
  - Total: 0
- Time zone: UTC-6 (Central (CST))
  - Summer (DST): UTC-5 (CDT)
- FIPS code: 48-50184
- GNIS feature ID: 2413030

Mustang is a town in Navarro County, Texas, United States. Its population was zero according to the 2020 census. It is one of 9 incorporated communities in the United States with no reported residents. In December 2021, Mark Cuban, entrepreneur and former owner of the Dallas Mavericks, purchased the 77-acre (31 ha) town for roughly $2 million.

== Geography ==
Mustang is situated at the northeastern corner of the junction of Interstate 45 and FM 739 in central Navarro County.

According to the United States Census Bureau, the town has a total area of 0.1 sq mi (26 ha), all land.

== History ==
Mustang was incorporated in 1973 for the purpose of selling alcohol in what was then a dry Navarro County. The incorporation effort was led by partners William "Bill" McKie, a former Corsicana city attorney, and Harold "Mack" McElhenney, a businessman. On October 30, 1973, the town approved beer sales. In a March 25, 1975, election, residents voted 20–0 in favor of selling hard liquor, as well as mixed beverages. Mustang had a population of 12 in the 1980 Census, which grew to 35 in 1990. By the mid-1990s, the town lost its status as the primary alcohol stop in the county, as other nearby communities began to repeal their blue laws.

The population of Mustang rose to 47 in 2000. Town founder Bill McKie negotiated a deal to sell Mustang to Tommy Sinclair, who leased a club in the community, on June 5, 2005, for $600,000. The transaction was not completed, however, and Sinclair filed a lawsuit in October 2005 for the right to buy the property. McKie died on November 11, 2005, and his wife Marsha took over legal proceedings on her late husband's behalf. Since McKie's death, legal wrangling over ownership of the town and financial issues have plagued Mustang. In November 2006, the city of Angus threatened to cut off water service to the community over an unpaid bill that totaled $3,400. Mrs. McKie, acting on the town's behalf, personally paid the bill. The case over ownership went back to court in April 2007. Four months later, Sinclair was given possession of Mustang, but not the deed. He promptly evicted many of the town council, as well as the city secretary and fire chief. The evictions went to court in November 2007 and a majority of the council left town, but refused to resign their posts. In February 2008, the two council members living in residence called for an election to be held that coming May. The town's disputed ownership status led to the holding of two separate council elections on May 10, 2008. The first election, endorsed by Tommy Sinclair, elected a mayor and five aldermen. The vote was canvassed on May 17. In the second called election, three aldermen positions were left open. Those results were canvassed on May 14. Eight votes were cast; six votes in one election and two in the other. Both governments claimed legitimacy.

Tommy Sinclair and two others were indicted on June 25, 2009, by a Navarro County grand jury in connection with the October 1, 2008, death of a Houston man after an alleged altercation at his cabaret in Mustang.

The Dallas Morning News reported in December 2021 that billionaire Mark Cuban purchased the entire town for around $2 million. The report indicated that a previous attempt to sell the town for $4 million failed to attract any buyers. Cuban stated that he had made the purchase to help a friend who needed to sell, and that he did not have any immediate plans for the property. According to the Dallas Observer, Cuban purchased the town from Merwyn Price, who had represented Sinclair in court against Marsha McKie. Price himself, along with two other owners, purchased the town in 2017 from real estate agent Mike Turner. Cuban explained in an episode of The Drew Barrymore Show taped in March 2022 that Price had been diagnosed with cancer, and the town had been his "only real asset" remaining. He also said he had the idea to transform the town into "Dinosaur, Texas" and fill it with attractions using robotic dinosaur models created by Dino Don, Inc., but in August 2022 clarified that this would not happen. The town attracted further attention in 2023 when photos of abandoned adult club Mustang Club being demolished were sent by a viewer to local news channel WFAA. Cuban told WFAA that this was "just cleaning up" and did not indicate any plans for the town. In 2024, Cuban was reported as having told Alcynna Lloyd in an email that he had never visited the town and had no future plans for it. Lloyd, writing for Business Insider, visited the town and reported it as "totally empty".

== Demographics ==
Historical population
Census	Pop.	Note	%±
1970	7		—
1980	12		71.4%
1990	35		191.7%
2000	47		34.3%
2010	21		−55.3%
2020	0		−100.0%
U.S. Decennial Census; 1850–1900 1910; 1920 1930 1940; 1950 1960 1970; 1980 1990 2000; 2010

As of the census of 2000, 47 people, 20 households, and 12 families were residing in the town. The population density was 372.6 inhabitants per square mile (143.9/km^{2}). The 23 housing units averaged 182.3 per square mile (68.3/km^{2}). The racial makeup of the town was 89.36% White, 8.51% African American, and 2.13% from two or more races.

Of the 20 households, 40.0% had children under the age of 18 living with them, 30.0% were married couples living together, 25.0% had a female householder with no spouse present, and 40.0% were not families. About 40.0% of all households were made up of individuals, and 5.0% had someone living alone who was 65 years of age or older. The average household size was 2.35, and the average family size was 3.08.

In the town, the population was distributed as 36.2% under the age of 18, 12.8% from 18 to 24, 27.7% from 25 to 44, 21.3% from 45 to 64, and 2.1% who were 65 years of age or older. The median age was 26 years. For every 100 females, there were 104.3 males. For every 100 females age 18 and over, there were 114.3 males.

The median income for a household in the town was $46,250, and for a family was $46,667. Males had a median income of $31,250 versus $0 for females. The per capita income for the town was $75,692. About 3.8% of the population lived below the poverty line, all of whom were over 64.

By the 2020 census, the population dropped to 0.

== Education ==
Public education in the town of Mustang is provided by the Corsicana Independent School District.
