= Bristol, Texas =

Census-designated place in Ellis County, Texas, United States

Bristol Formerly Heelstring and Brockville
- Census-designated place
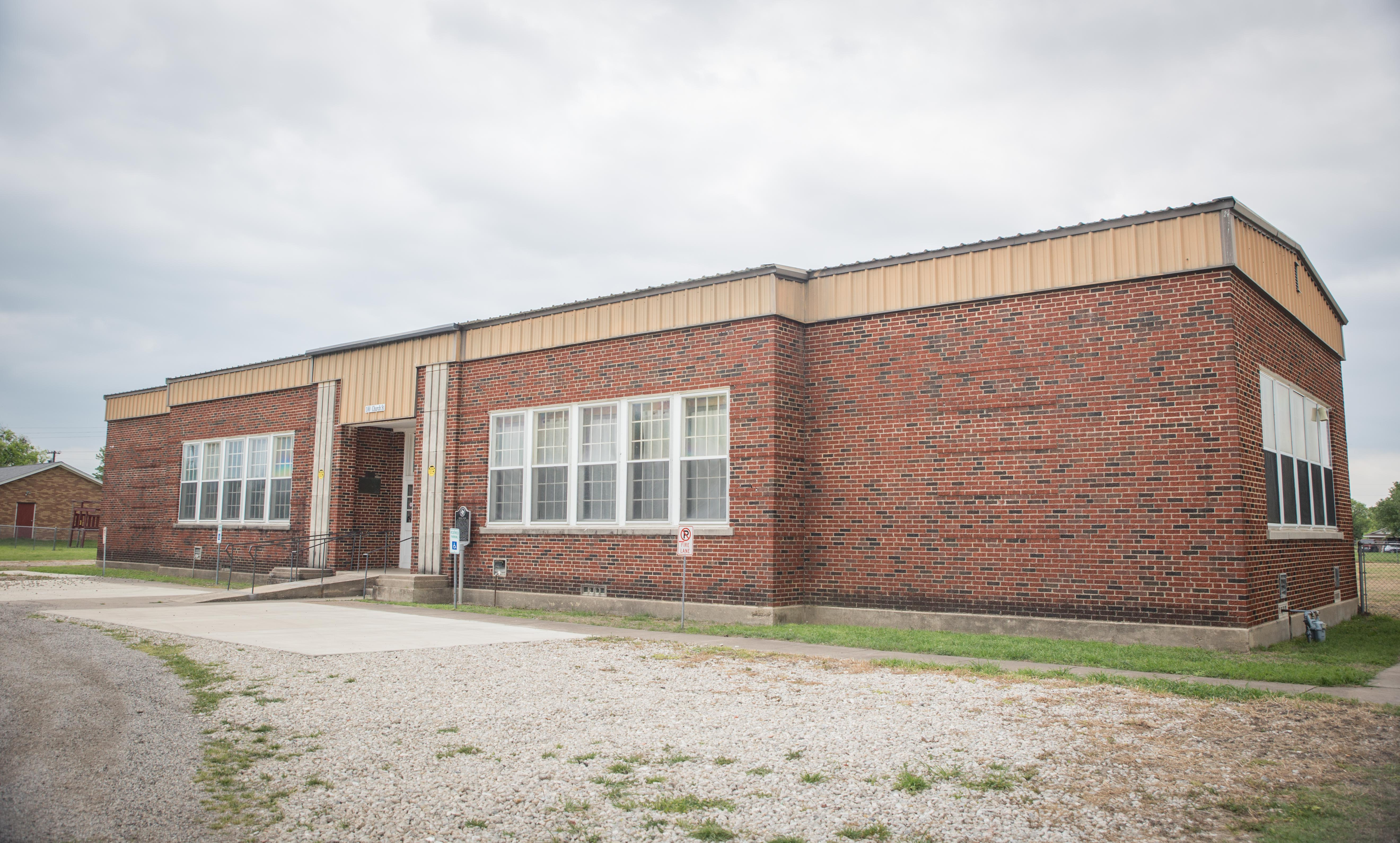
- Bristol School, April 2023
- Nickname: The Bluebonnet Capitol of Texas!
- Location within Texas
- Coordinates: 32°27′18″N 96°34′02″W
- Country: United States
- State: Texas
- County: Ellis

Area
  - Total: 5.88 sq mi (15.2 km^{2})
  - Land: 5.78 sq mi (15.0 km^{2})
  - Water: 0.10 sq mi (0.26 km^{2})
- Elevation: 489 ft (149 m)

Population (2010)
  - Total: 668
  - Density: 116/sq mi (44.6/km^{2})
- Time zone: UTC-6 (Central)
  - Summer (DST): UTC-5 (Central)
- ZIP code: 75119
- Area codes: 214, 469, 945, 972
- GNIS feature ID: 2586912

Bristol is a census-designated place in Ellis County, Texas, United States. As of the 2020 census, Bristol had a population of 714.

== Geography ==
Bristol is located along Farm to Market Road 660 in northeastern Ellis County, approximately six miles northeast of Palmer and eighteen miles northeast of Waxahachie. It is part of the Dallas–Fort Worth metroplex.

According to the United States Census Bureau, the CDP has a total area of 5.88 square miles (15.2 km^{2}), of which 5.78 square miles (15.0 km^{2}) is land and 0.10 square miles (0.26 km^{2}) is water. FM 660 connects Bristol to the towns of Ennis, Palmer, and Ferris, and Union Hill Rd connects Bristol to Crip.

== History ==
The area was first settled in the 1840s by Joshua Brock of Missouri. The community was first called Brockville and a post office operated under that name from 1854 to 1869. The name Brockville was a result of Joshua Brock who was the town's first postmaster general. Later, the community was unofficially known as Heelstring. The town itself was located on the banks of the Trinity River. This area is commonly referred to as the, "River Bottoms", by local residents. The town was destroyed by a fire in the late 1800's and relocated to the current location.

Years later, Captain Steven Mills came to the area and opened a store. Having done business in Bristol, England, he named the store Bristol and the community eventually adopted the name. By 1890, Bristol had grown into a farming community of approximately 200 residents. The population peaked at around 300 in the early 1930s and declined thereafter. The community continues to serve as a supply and service center for area farmers and local beef ranches.

In 2010, Bristol was defined as a census-designated place (CDP) by the U.S. Census Bureau. The boundaries include the original community of Bristol and surrounding areas.

Today the community holds several events including the monthly Bristol Opry, 4 July Celebration, Easter Bunny Breakfast, and Thanksgiving Dinner.

== Demographics ==
Historical population
Census	Pop.	Note	%±
2010	668		—
2020	714		6.9%
U.S. Decennial Census; 1850–1900 1910; 1920 1930 1940; 1950 1960 1970; 1980 1990 2000; 2010 2020

Bristol first appeared as a census designated place in the 2010 U.S. census.

Bristol CDP, Texas – Racial and ethnic composition Note: the US Census treats Hispanic/Latino as an ethnic category. This table excludes Latinos from the racial categories and assigns them to a separate category. Hispanics/Latinos may be of any race.
Race / Ethnicity (NH = Non-Hispanic)	Pop 2010	Pop 2020	% 2010	% 2020
White alone (NH)	544	526	81.44%	73.67%
Black or African American alone (NH)	18	26	2.69%	3.64%
Native American or Alaska Native alone (NH)	3	0	0.45%	0.00%
Asian alone (NH)	1	5	0.15%	0.70%
Native Hawaiian or Pacific Islander alone (NH)	0	0	0.00%	0.00%
Other race alone (NH)	1	0	0.15%	0.00%
Mixed race or Multiracial (NH)	2	28	0.30%	3.92%
Hispanic or Latino (any race)	99	129	14.82%	18.07%
Total	668	714	100.00%	100.00%

=== 2010 census ===
At the 2010 United States census there were 668 people, 239 households, and 188 families residing in the CDP. The racial makeup of the city was 91.2% White (81.4% Non-Hispanic White), 0.4% Native American, 2.8% African American, 0.1% Asian, 4.8% from other races, and 0.6% from two or more races. Hispanic or Latino of any race were 14.8% of the population.

== Education ==
The community’s first school was housed in a multi-purpose building erected in 1870. The Bristol Rural School District was established in 1877. Youth from throughout the area attended the Bristol schoolhouse built in 1886 and 1913. A new brick school containing five classrooms and an auditorium and stage was completed by the U.S. Works Progress Administration (WPA) in 1939. 130 pupils attended the 9-grade, 6-teacher school in 1940-41. In the 1940 school year it was recorded that Bristol High School had a basketball and baseball team as well as a 4-H club. The school served the area until 1955. In 1957 its facilities and grounds were deeded to the Bristol Cemetery Association. Today the school is used as a community center for the town.

Currently, the Ennis Independent School District, Ferris Independent School District, and Palmer Independent School District each serve portions of the Bristol CDP.

== Cemeteries ==
The small town has three cemeteries, the largest and currently used is the Bristol Cemetery located in town and administered by the Bristol Cemetery Association. Two of the older cemeteries is the Hefley Pioneer Cemetery located on Slate Rock Road and Union Hill Cemetery located on Union Hill Road. Union Hill served as a burial spot for Union soldiers during the Civil War. Both historical cemeteries are maintained by local volunteers.

== See also ==
- List of census-designated places in Texas
