= Julius Schepps =

American businessman (1895–1971)

Coordinates: 32°46′55″N 96°47′20″W

Julius Schepps (November 16, 1895 – May 25, 1971) was an American civic leader and businessman.

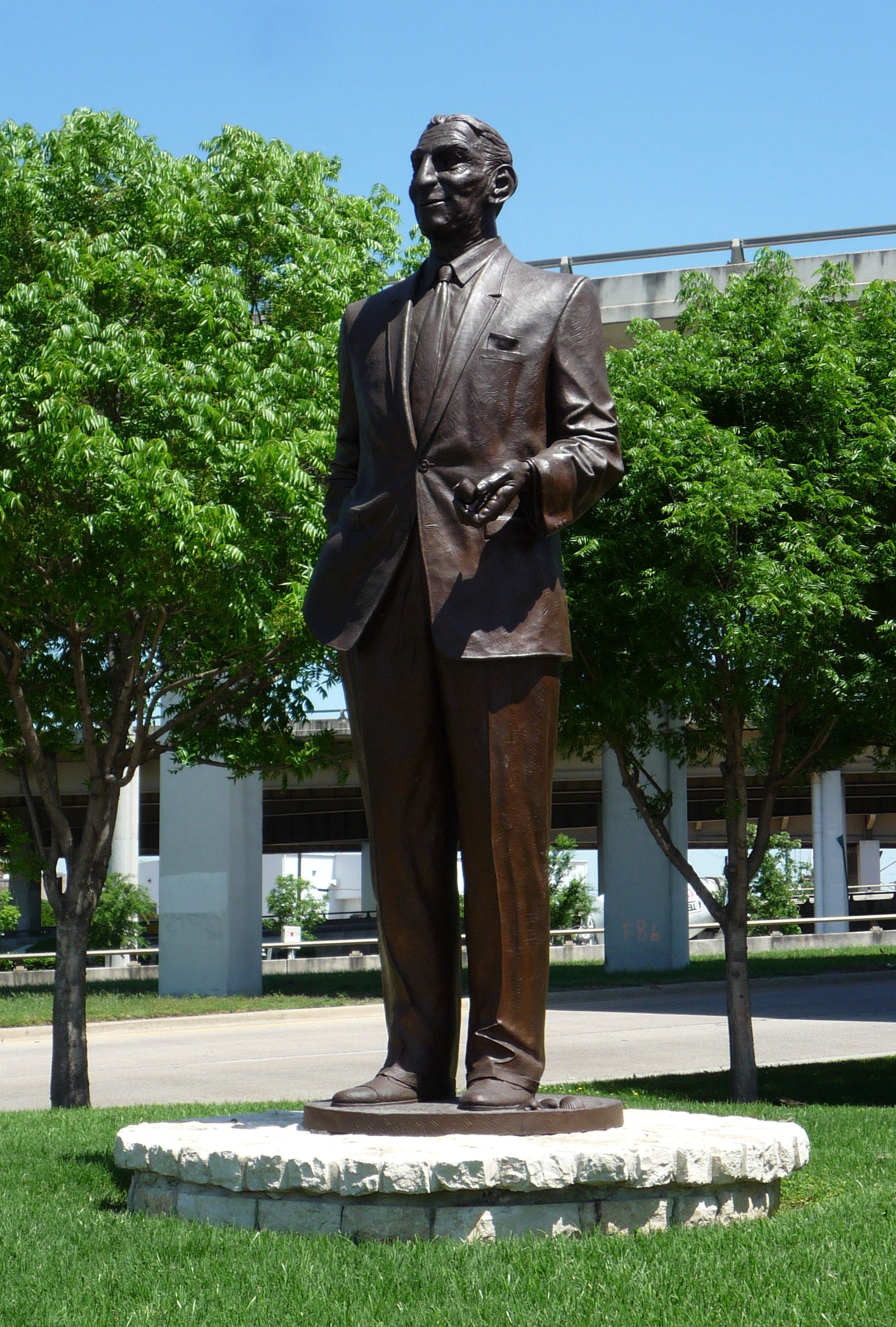
A Statue of Julius Schepps, located at the Julius Schepps Park, Dallas, Texas

== Early life ==
Schepps was born in St. Louis, Missouri to parents Joseph and Jennie (née Nathanson) Schepps, Russian Jews who had immigrated in 1891. When his parents moved to Dallas, Texas in 1901 to start a bakery business, he worked in the bakery and sold newspapers. He attended Texas A&M University for seventeen days in 1914 on a basketball scholarship until it was discovered that he lacked a high school education.

== Later years ==
Though Schepps was forced to leave the university soon after his arrival, he became a lifetime supporter of it. He later moved to El Paso and worked there for two years. He married Phyllis Eickman in El Paso in 1915, with whom he later had three children.

== Business life ==
Schepps acquired the family bakery in 1922 when his father Joe Schepps died (it was sold in 1928). After the bakery was sold, he started an insurance company that lasted 43 years. He established the Schepps Brewing Company in 1934 and sold it the next year. He served on the board of directors (once as chairman) for the Mercantile National Bank from 1922 until his death. He shared other business interests including bakeries and other insurance companies. His success as a businessman allowed him to become a generous contributor to a number of charities.

== Charity work ==
Schepps donated close to $120,000 to the relief of Jews in the United States during World War II and contributed to build a retirement home for the Jewish population in Dallas. Schepps was once a member of St. Peter's Roman Catholic Parochial School, co-chairman of the mission to build St. Paul Hospital in Dallas, and was also a member of other Protestant groups. He acted as director of the United Fund, the Dallas Chamber of Commerce, the Carruth Memorial Rehabilitation Center, WRR classical radio station (the oldest radio station in Texas, and second oldest in the United States), and the Dallas Citizens Council. Schepps served on the committee for the West Dallas Housing Project in later years.

Schepps served on the grand jury that investigated a string of bombings in African-American communities in the 1950s in Dallas, and headed the first biracial committee in Dallas.

== Awards ==
Schepps received the Linz Award in 1953 and was recognized as "Dallas's Most Outstanding Citizen" the following year. He was recognized as "Headliner of the Year" by the Press Club of Dallas in 1962. Three years later, he received a "Brotherhood Citation" by the National Conference of Christians and Jews and was given the Humanitarian Award by B'nai B'rith.

The stretch of Interstate 45 within the City of Dallas, and a small park in Deep Ellum are both named in his honor.
