= Galveston–Houston Electric Railway =

Galveston and Houston Electric Railway
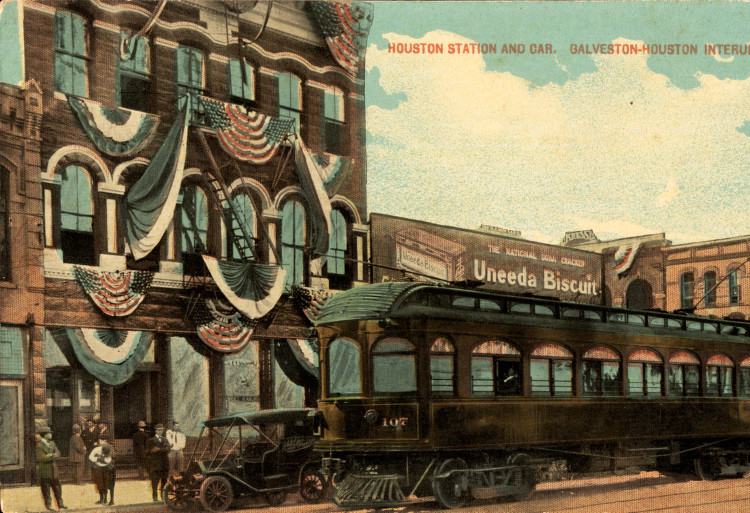
- Houston station and car from the Galveston-Houston Interurban Railroad (postcard, circa 1915)

Overview
- Status: Defunct
- Locale: Houston, Texas

Service
- Type: Interurban

Technical
- Track gauge: 4 ft 8 1/2 in (1,435 mm) standard gauge
- Electrification: Trolley wire

The Galveston–Houston Electric Railway was an interurban railway between Galveston and Houston, Texas from 1911 to 1936. The railway was recognized as the fastest interurban line in 1925 and 1926.

== Route ==
The Interurban ran the 50 miles (80 km) from downtown Houston to downtown Galveston in as little as 75 minutes. The track roughly followed the current path of Interstate 45 (Gulf Freeway), and is now used as a utility right of way for high tension power lines. The Galveston Bay causeway was considered a great feat of engineering and cost about US$2 million (US$36.3 million in 2024) to build in the late 1910s.

While most of the original stations have been demolished to make room for new structures, several artifacts remain. Daikin Park was built from Union Station, and features a railway theme. Before Interstate 45, a small, two-story interurban station was located on College Avenue where it crossed Airport Boulevard. This crossing was not at right angles but like an "X" and would be located slightly east of I-45 on the feeder street, if it still existed today. Airport Blvd becomes College Ave in South Houston at I-45. The original causeway in Galveston can be easily seen to the east from the interstate highway causeway.

Other stops included Park Place, City of South Houston (formerly City of Dumont), College Ave/Airport Blvd at Interstate 45, Clear Creek Crossing (the power station), and the Galveston Terminal on 21st Street, between Church and Post Office streets.

== Future ==
There has been recent talk of re-establishing some form of train service between Houston and Galveston. In 2002, test trips have been made using Amtrak equipment under the Gulfliner name. The Trinity Railway Express sent a train to Houston in 2005, with the intention of using it as an evacuation train during Hurricane Rita, though it was not needed. As late as 2007, the city of Galveston was considering reviving Galveston-Houston passenger rail, potentially on the GH&H corridor. It has been suggested that some parts of the old Interurban right of way might be used to bypass congested sections of track on the host railroad.
