= Galveston Causeway =

George and Cynthia Mitchell Memorial Causeway
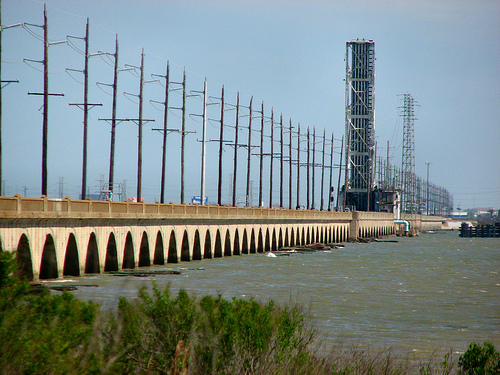
- The old 1912 Galveston Causeway, now in use as a railroad bridge.
- Coordinates: 29°17′45″N 94°53′10″W
- Carries: BNSF Railway/Union Pacific Railroad (old causeway); I-45 (new causeway)
- Crosses: Gulf Intracoastal Waterway, Galveston Bay
- Locale: Connects Galveston, Texas and Texas City, Texas, United States
- Official name: George & Cynthia Mitchell Memorial Causeway
- Maintained by: Texas Department of Transportation

History
- Engineering design by: Concrete Steel Engineering Company
- Constructed by: Penn Bridge Company
- Construction start: 1912
- Opened: 1912 (original causeway)
- Galveston Causeway
- U.S. National Register of Historic Places
- Texas State Antiquities Landmark
- Area: 39 acres (16 ha)
- NRHP reference No.: 76002028
- TSAL No.: 8200001369

Significant dates
- Added to NRHP: December 12, 1976
- Designated TSAL: January 1, 1981

Location
- Interactive map of George and Cynthia Mitchell Memorial Causeway

The George and Cynthia Mitchell Memorial Causeway is a set of causeways in Galveston, Texas, United States. Two of the routes carry the southbound and northbound traffic of Interstate 45, while the original causeway is restricted to rail traffic. It is the main roadway access point to Galveston Island. The second access point is Bolivar Ferry.

The causeway carries traffic over Galveston Bay and the Gulf Intracoastal Waterway. The original causeway was built in 1912 and carried both rail and auto traffic. The auto traffic was transferred to new causeways built to the west in 1939, leaving the original bridge for rail traffic. The original route was listed on the National Register of Historic Places in 1976.

== Rebuilding in 2003 ==
New Galveston Causeway bridge under construction in 2007

Construction of replacement bridges for both auto routes began in 2003 with completion of the new northbound bridge in 2005. The construction of a new southbound bridge began in 2006, however Hurricane Ike delayed completion until November 2008.

== 2008 hurricane damage ==
In September 2008, the causeway flooded badly before Hurricane Ike due to the tremendous storm surge created by the very wide storm. This is in contrast to a typical hurricane, which would cause the closure of the causeway due to wind before surge. As of the early afternoon on September 13, 12 hours after official landfall, the causeway was blocked by numerous watercraft.

== Railroad drawbridge replacement ==
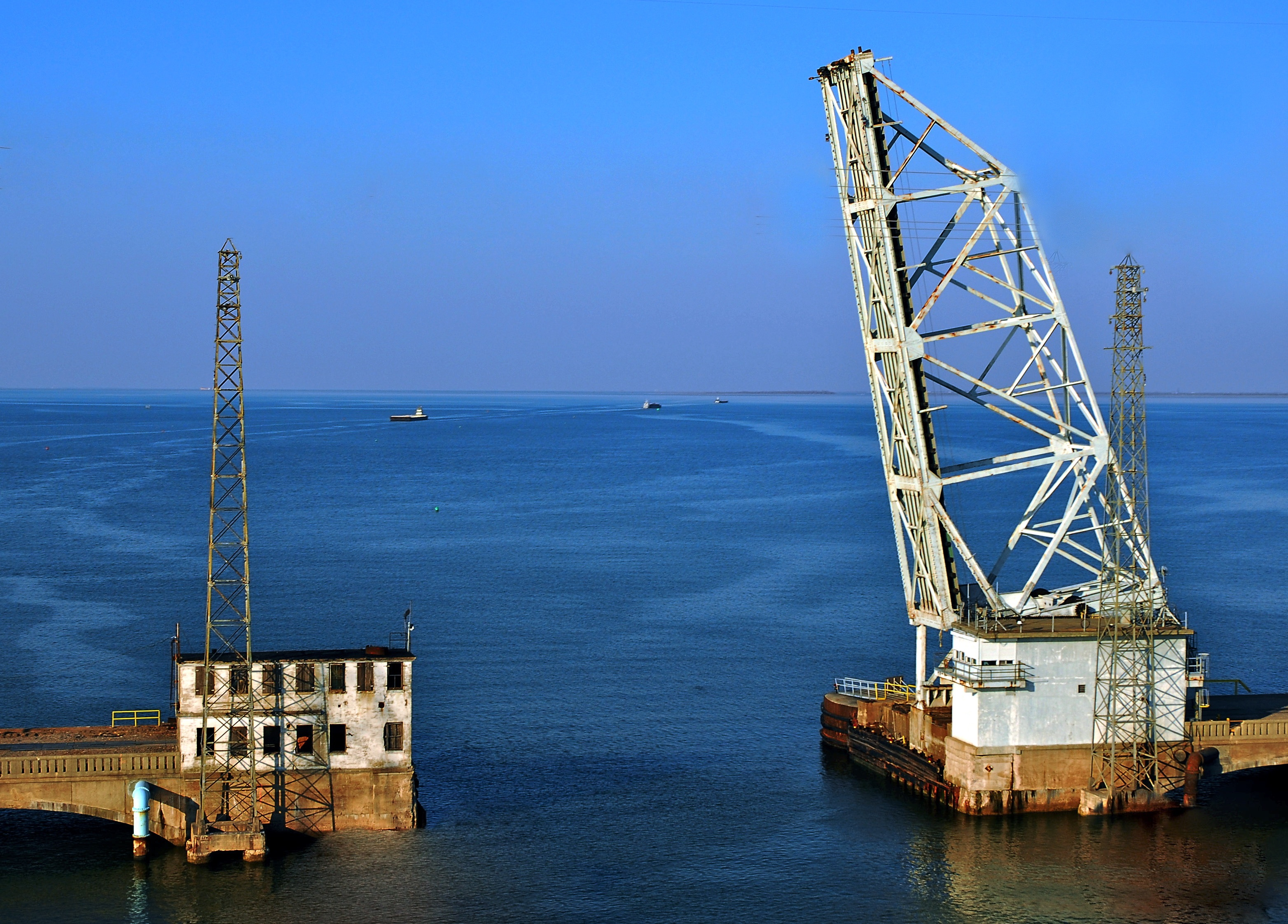
The old bascule bridge in its raised position.

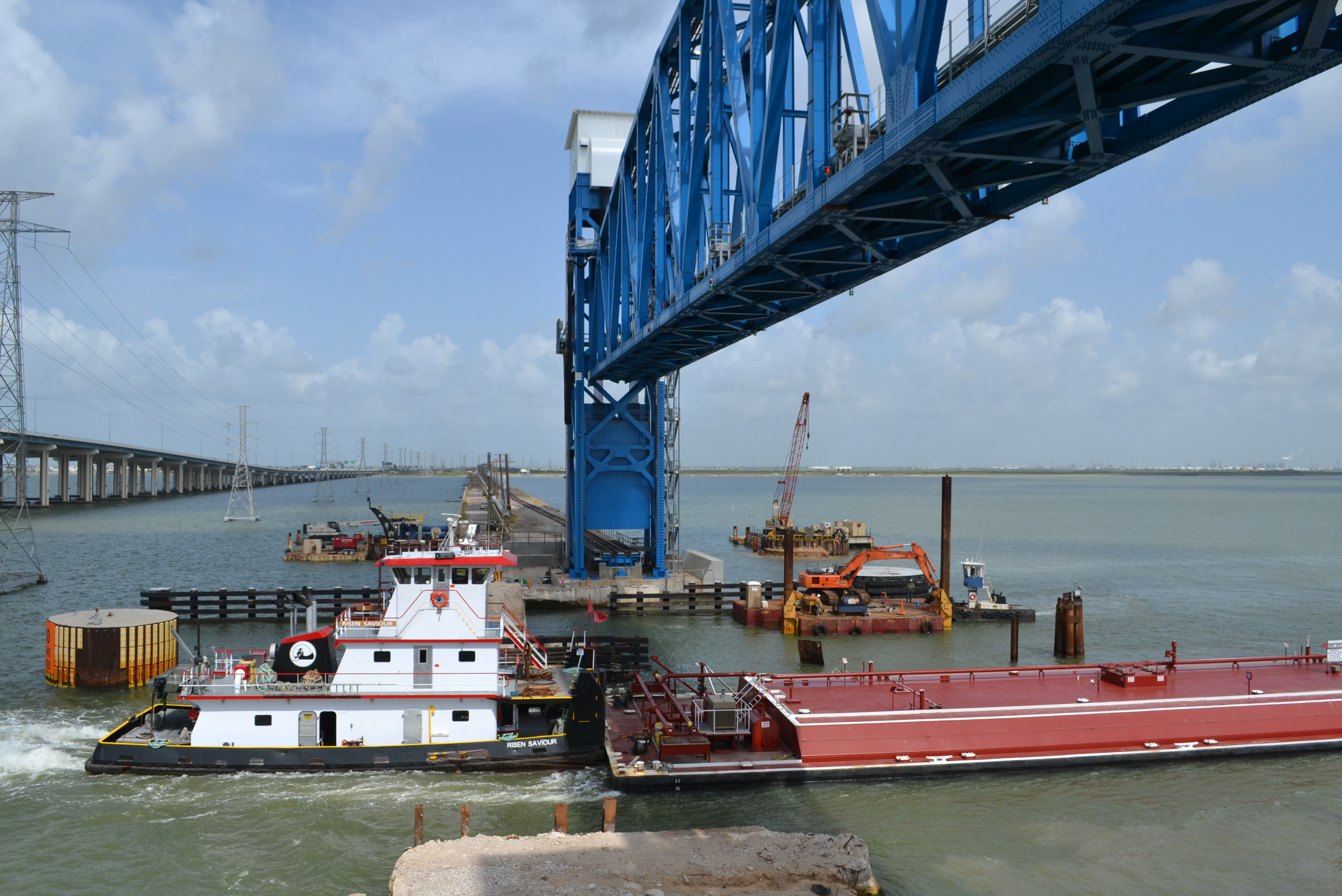
A barge passing under the new lift span on the railroad causeway, with the 2008-opened new causeway for road vehicles visible at left.

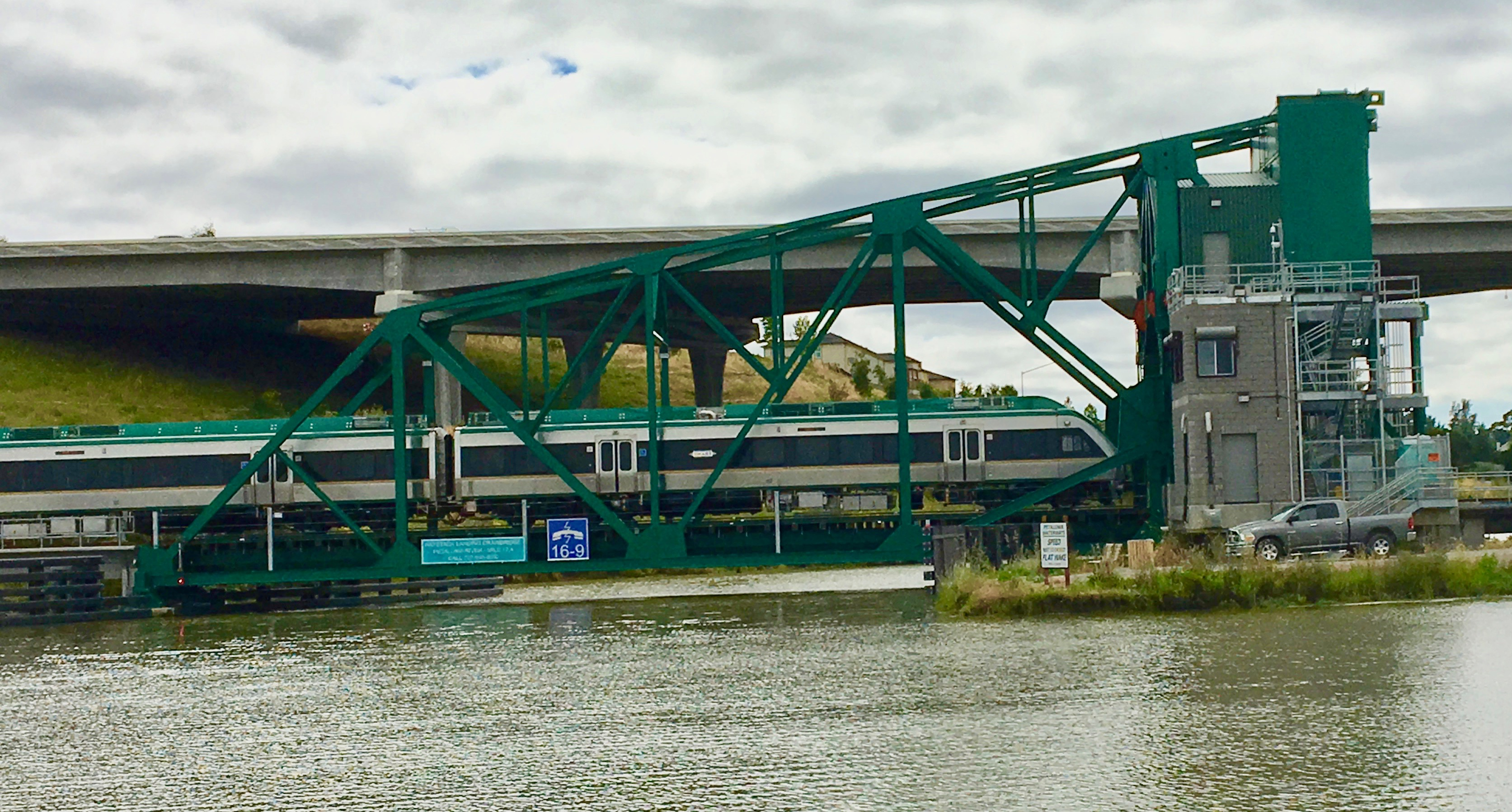
The old bascule span now in Petaluma, California. It was repainted to match the theme color for the commuter train seen here. The taller bridge in the background is US 101.

The original drawspan was replaced in 1987 with a new, narrower bascule span that pivoted from the island side of instead of the mainland side as the original did. The new span did not include space for a roadway, and a new service building was built on the old roadway on the island side of the channel. In 2001, the U.S. Coast Guard had declared the old span's narrow passageway to be a hazard to navigation. It was only 105 feet (32 m) wide, whereas the replacement vertical-lift span allowed the channel to be widened to about 300 feet (91 m). In 2012, the bascule-type drawbridge on the railroad causeway was again replaced with a vertical-lift-type drawbridge, allowing the navigation channel through the draw span to be widened. The old bridge was sold to Sonoma–Marin Area Rail Transit to be installed on the Northwestern Pacific Railroad in Petaluma, California to cross the Petaluma River.

== Re-dedication ==
The causeway was re-dedicated in honor of George Mitchell and his wife Cynthia Woods-Mitchell on Tuesday October 25, 2016, to honor their contributions to the island and City of Galveston.

== See also ==
- List of bridges documented by the Historic American Engineering Record in Texas
- National Register of Historic Places listings in Galveston County, Texas
