= Palmer Independent School District =

School district in Texas

Palmer Independent School District is a public school district based in Palmer, Texas (USA).

It includes a portion of Ennis and a portion of the Bristol census-designated place.

In 2009, the school district was rated "academically acceptable" by the Texas Education Agency.

== Schools ==
Palmer ISD operates three campuses

- Palmer High School
- Palmer Middle School
- Palmer Elementary School
