= Richland, Texas =

- Town
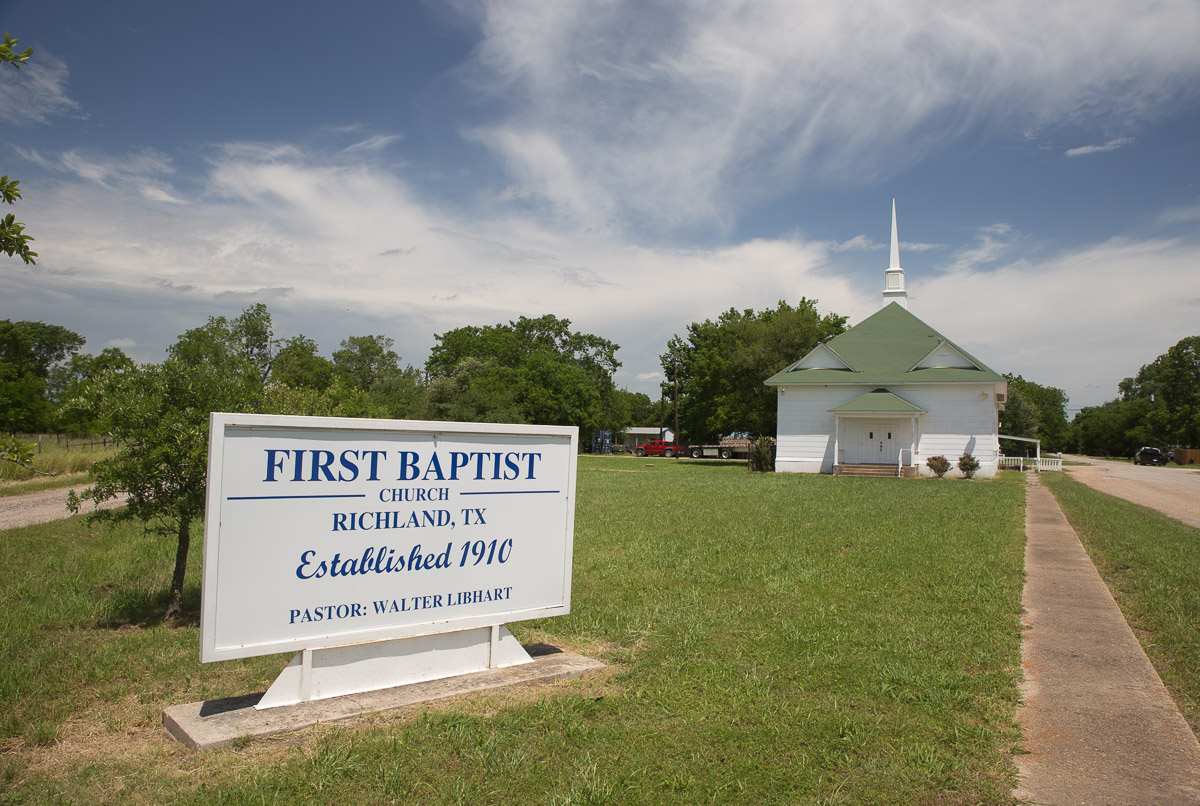
- First Baptist Church

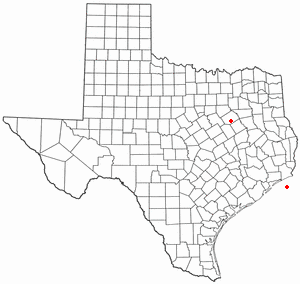
- Location of Richland, Texas

- Coordinates: 31°52′30″N 96°26′30″W
- Country: United States
- State: Texas
- County: Navarro

Area
  - Total: 1.52 sq mi (3.93 km^{2})
  - Land: 1.51 sq mi (3.91 km^{2})
  - Water: 0.012 sq mi (0.03 km^{2})
- Elevation: 367 ft (112 m)

Population (2020)
  - Total: 255
  - Density: 169/sq mi (65.2/km^{2})
- Time zone: UTC-6 (Central (CST))
  - Summer (DST): UTC-5 (CDT)
- ZIP code: 76681
- Area codes: 903, 430
- FIPS code: 48-61820
- GNIS feature ID: 2412548
- Website: www.richlandtexas.gov

Historical population
Census	Pop.	Note	%±
1930	541		—
1940	369		−31.8%
1950	308		−16.5%
1960	287		−6.8%
1970	309		7.7%
1980	260		−15.9%
1990	244		−6.2%
2000	291		19.3%
2010	264		−9.3%
2020	255		−3.4%
U.S. Decennial Census; 2020 Census

Richland is a town in Navarro County, Texas, United States. The population was 255 at the 2020 census.

== Geography ==
According to the United States Census Bureau, the town has a total area of 1.1 square miles (2.8 km^{2}), all land.

== History ==
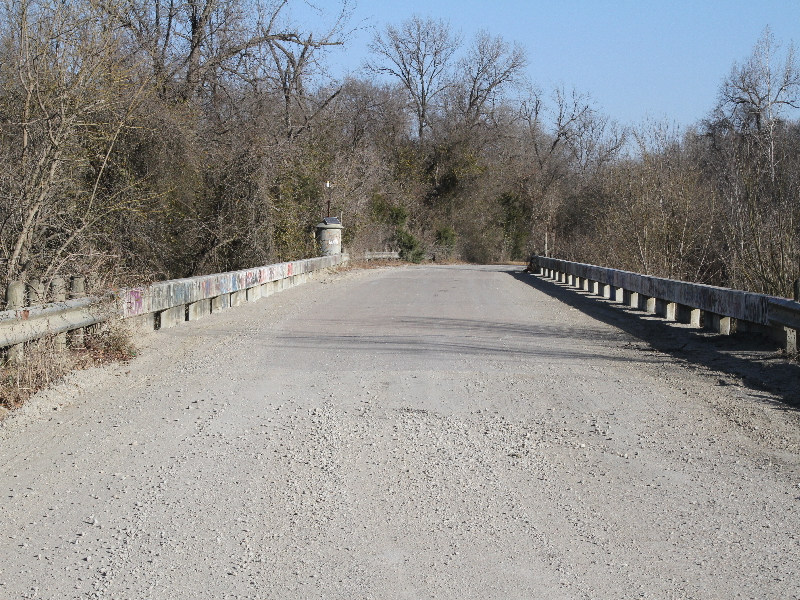
Love's Bridge at Richland Creek Crossing Near Richland Texas.

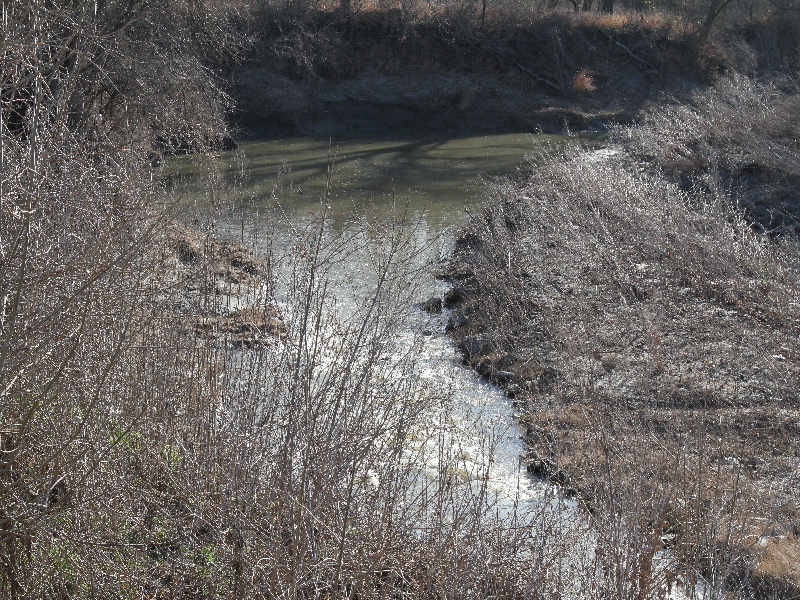
Richland Crossing Navarro County Texas from Love's Bridge, Love's Bridge Road. Low water crossing used by early Navarro County settlers.

Richland, at the junction of Interstate 45 and State Highway 14, on Pisgah Ridge twelve miles south of Corsicana in south central Navarro County, was first settled in the late 1840s. Asa Chambers had established a store on the trail from Corsicana to Franklin by 1848, when a post office, named Richland Crossing after nearby Richland Creek, opened in his store. The store, which moved and changed ownership several times, continued to form the nucleus of the community until the early 1870s. When the Houston and Texas Central Railway was built through the area in 1871, the station on the Pisgah Ridge near the store was designated Richland, and a new community began to develop around the depot. A post office named Richland began operating in 1878, and by the mid-1890s the town had two steam gristmills and cotton gins, three general stores, a grocer, two blacksmiths, two saloons, a hardware store, a bank, and an estimated population of 150. The first school had begun operating around the time of the Civil War, and by 1906 the town had a two-teacher school with an enrollment of seventy-five. Richland continued to prosper during the 1920s, reaching a peak population of 750 in 1929. During the 1930s its population began to decline, in part because of the Great Depression. By 1950 the town had twelve businesses and a population of 369. The decline continued during the 1960s and 1970s, and by 1990 Richland had 244 residents and one business. The population reached 291 in 2000.

== Demographics ==
As of the census of 2000, there were 291 people, 126 households, and 79 families residing in the town. The population density was 272.8 inhabitants per square mile (105.3/km^{2}). There were 137 housing units at an average density of 128.4 per square mile (49.6/km^{2}). The racial makeup of the town was 89.69% White, 5.84% African American, 0.34% Native American, 0.34% Asian, 2.06% from other races, and 1.72% from two or more races. Hispanic or Latino of any race were 4.12% of the population.

There were 126 households, out of which 22.2% had children under the age of 18 living with them, 54.8% were married couples living together, 5.6% had a female householder with no husband present, and 37.3% were non-families. 31.7% of all households were made up of individuals, and 15.9% had someone living alone who was 65 years of age or older. The average household size was 2.31 and the average family size was 2.91.

In the town, the population was spread out, with 19.9% under the age of 18, 11.3% from 18 to 24, 24.1% from 25 to 44, 27.1% from 45 to 64, and 17.5% who were 65 years of age or older. The median age was 41 years. For every 100 females, there were 115.6 males. For every 100 females age 18 and over, there were 104.4 males.

The median income for a household in the town was $33,056, and the median income for a family was $36,406. Males had a median income of $26,625 versus $17,500 for females. The per capita income for the town was $17,440. About 15.8% of families and 17.6% of the population were below the poverty line, including 23.3% of those under the age of eighteen and 25.6% of those 65 or over.

== Education ==
The City of Richland is served by the Corsicana Independent School District.
