= Angus, Texas =

- City
- Interactive map of Angus, Texas
- Coordinates: 32°00′03″N 96°25′42″W
- Country: United States
- State: Texas
- County: Navarro

Area
  - Total: 3.30 sq mi (8.54 km^{2})
  - Land: 3.29 sq mi (8.52 km^{2})
  - Water: 0.0077 sq mi (0.02 km^{2})
- Elevation: 410 ft (120 m)

Population (2020)
  - Total: 444
  - Density: 135/sq mi (52.1/km^{2})
- Time zone: UTC-6 (Central (CST))
  - Summer (DST): UTC-5 (CDT)
- FIPS code: 48-03288
- GNIS feature ID: 2409711
- Website: cityofangustx.gov

Angus is a city in Navarro County, Texas, United States. The population was 444 at the 2020 census.

== Geography ==
According to the United States Census Bureau, the city has a total area of 3.3 square miles (8.5 km^{2}), of which 3.3 square miles (8.5 km^{2}) is land and 0.04 square miles (0.10 km^{2}) (0.60%) is water.

== Demographics ==
Historical population
| Census | Pop. | Note | %± |
|---|---|---|---|
| 1970 | 93 | | — |
| 1980 | 244 | | 162.4% |
| 1990 | 363 | | 48.8% |
| 2000 | 334 | | −8.0% |
| 2010 | 414 | | 24.0% |
| 2020 | 444 | | 7.2% |
U.S. Decennial Census; 2020 Census

=== 2020 census ===
As of the 2020 census, Angus had a population of 444, and the median age was 41.4 years. Twenty-five percent of residents were under the age of 18 and 15.1% of residents were 65 years of age or older. For every 100 females there were 102.7 males, and for every 100 females age 18 and over there were 97.0 males age 18 and over.

As of the 2020 census, 0% of residents lived in urban areas, while 100.0% lived in rural areas.

There were 160 households in Angus, of which 38.1% had children under the age of 18 living in them. Of all households, 48.8% were married-couple households, 18.8% were households with a male householder and no spouse or partner present, and 23.8% were households with a female householder and no spouse or partner present. About 20.6% of all households were made up of individuals and 9.4% had someone living alone who was 65 years of age or older.

There were 179 housing units, of which 10.6% were vacant. Among occupied housing units, 81.9% were owner-occupied and 18.1% were renter-occupied. The homeowner vacancy rate was 2.2% and the rental vacancy rate was 11.4%.

Racial composition as of the 2020 census
| Race | Percent |
|---|---|
| White | 68.9% |
| Black or African American | 4.1% |
| American Indian and Alaska Native | 1.6% |
| Asian | 0.5% |
| Native Hawaiian and Other Pacific Islander | 0.9% |
| Some other race | 6.5% |
| Two or more races | 17.6% |
| Hispanic or Latino (of any race) | 22.3% |

=== 2000 census ===
As of the census of 2000, there were 334 people, 129 households, and 97 families residing in the city. The population density was 101.5 inhabitants per square mile (39.2/km^{2}). There were 139 housing units at an average density of 42.3 per square mile (16.3/km^{2}). The racial makeup of the city was 88.32% White, 1.80% African American, 1.80% Asian, 0.60% Pacific Islander, 2.99% from other races, and 4.49% from two or more races. Hispanic or Latino of any race were 7.78% of the population.

There were 129 households, out of which 33.3% had children under the age of 18 living with them, 68.2% were married couples living together, 7.0% had a female householder with no husband present, and 24.8% were non-families. 19.4% of all households were made up of individuals, and 9.3% had someone living alone who was 65 years of age or older. The average household size was 2.59 and the average family size was 2.99.

In the city, the population was spread out, with 26.3% under the age of 18, 6.6% from 18 to 24, 30.5% from 25 to 44, 24.3% from 45 to 64, and 12.3% who were 65 years of age or older. The median age was 38 years. For every 100 females, there were 103.7 males. For every 100 females age 18 and over, there were 105.0 males.

The median income for a household in the city was $36,944, and the median income for a family was $38,472. Males had a median income of $24,531 versus $20,179 for females. The per capita income for the city was $16,776. About 11.3% of families and 13.6% of the population were below the poverty line, including 17.1% of those under age 18 and 26.9% of those age 65 or over.

== Education ==
The City of Angus is served by the Corsicana Independent School District.
