= Palmer, Texas =

- Town
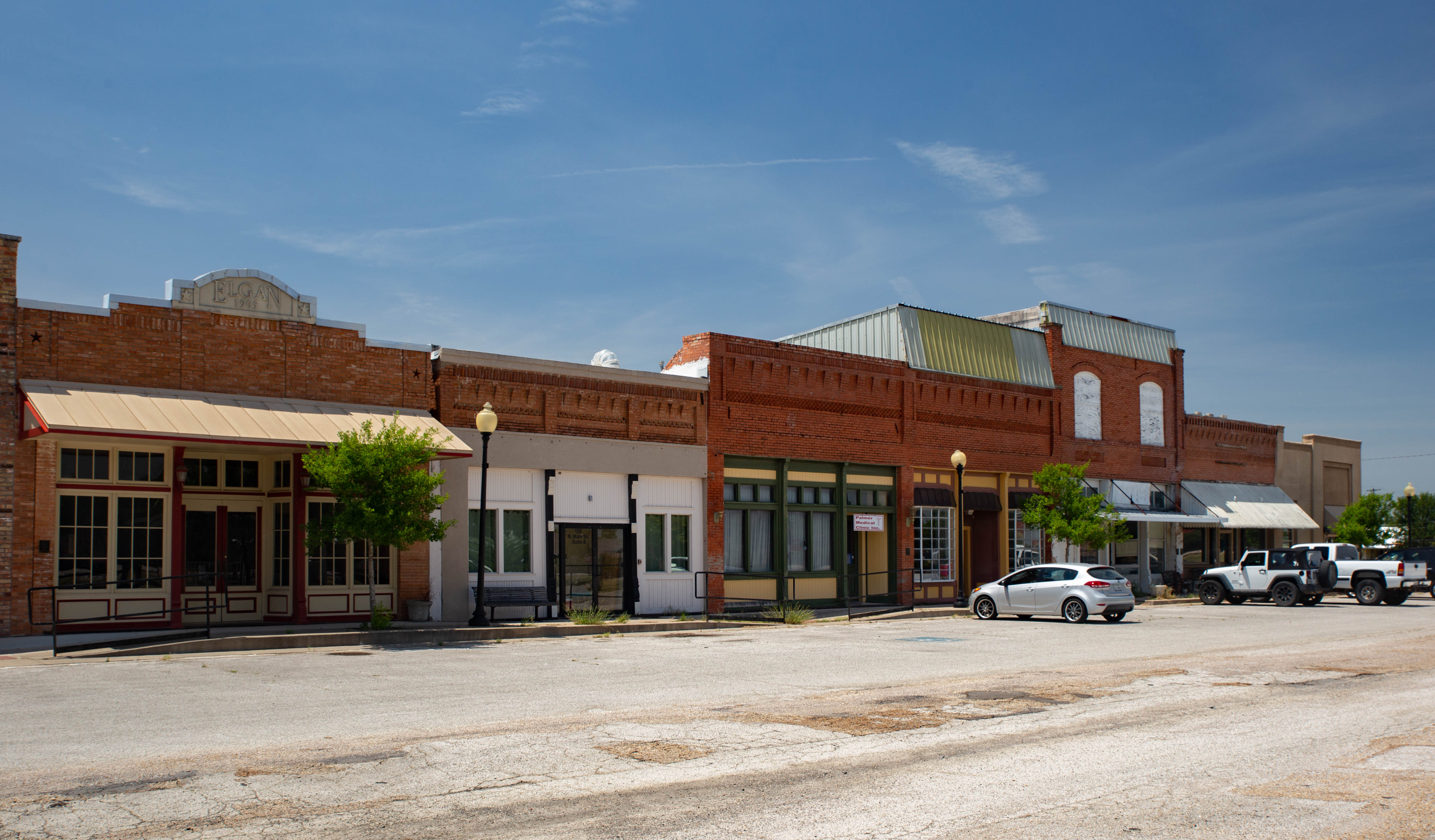
- Downtown

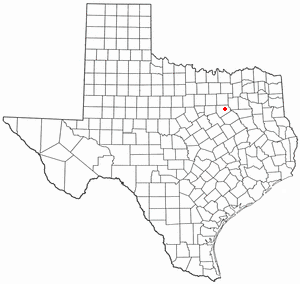
- Location of Palmer, Texas

- Coordinates: 32°25′32″N 96°40′21″W
- Country: United States
- State: Texas
- County: Ellis

Area
  - Total: 3.15 sq mi (8.16 km^{2})
  - Land: 3.11 sq mi (8.06 km^{2})
  - Water: 0.039 sq mi (0.10 km^{2})
- Elevation: 466 ft (142 m)

Population (2020)
  - Total: 2,393
  - Density: 769/sq mi (297/km^{2})
- Time zone: UTC-6 (Central (CST))
  - Summer (DST): UTC-5 (CDT)
- ZIP code: 75152
- Area codes: 214, 469, 945, 972
- FIPS code: 48-54744
- GNIS feature ID: 2413102
- Website: www.ci.palmer.tx.us

Palmer is a town in Ellis County, Texas, United States. It is part of the Dallas–Fort Worth metroplex. Its population was 2,393 in 2020.

== Geography ==
Palmer is located in northeastern Ellis County. Interstate 45 passes through the east side of the town, with access from Exits 258 through 260; I-45 leads north 27 miles (43 km) to downtown Dallas and south 8 miles (13 km) to Ennis. Waxahachie, the county seat, is 11 miles (18 km) to the west.

According to the United States Census Bureau, the town has a total area of 3.0 square miles (7.8 km^{2}), of which 0.04 square miles (0.1 km^{2}), or 1.04%, is covered by water.

== Demographics ==
Historical population
| Census | Pop. | Note | %± |
|---|---|---|---|
| 1880 | 63 | | — |
| 1890 | 250 | | 296.8% |
| 1900 | 480 | | 92.0% |
| 1910 | 605 | | 26.0% |
| 1920 | 748 | | 23.6% |
| 1930 | 758 | | 1.3% |
| 1940 | 697 | | −8.0% |
| 1950 | 647 | | −7.2% |
| 1960 | 613 | | −5.3% |
| 1970 | 601 | | −2.0% |
| 1980 | 1,187 | | 97.5% |
| 1990 | 1,659 | | 39.8% |
| 2000 | 1,774 | | 6.9% |
| 2010 | 2,000 | | 12.7% |
| 2020 | 2,393 | | 19.7% |
U.S. Decennial Census

Palmer racial composition as of 2020 (NH = Non-Hispanic) (Note: Note: the US Census treats Hispanic/Latino as an ethnic category. This table excludes Latinos from the racial categories and assigns them to a separate category. Hispanics/Latinos can be of any race.)
| Race | Number | Percentage |
|---|---|---|
| White (NH) | 1,347 | 56.29% |
| Black or African American (NH) | 45 | 1.88% |
| Native American or Alaska Native (NH) | 9 | 0.38% |
| Asian (NH) | 4 | 0.17% |
| Pacific Islander (NH) | 1 | 0.04% |
| Some Other Race (NH) | 6 | 0.25% |
| Multiracial (NH) | 108 | 4.51% |
| Hispanic or Latino | 873 | 36.48% |
| Total | 2,393 | |

As of the 2020 United States census, 2,393 people, 782 households, and 627 families were residing in the town.

== Culture ==
Portions of Tender Mercies, a 1983 film about a country western singer, were filmed in Palmer, although the majority was filmed in Waxahachie. In both towns, director Bruce Beresford deliberately filmed more barren and isolated locations that more closely resembled the West Texas area. The Texas town portrayed in Tender Mercies is never specifically identified.

== Education ==
Palmer Independent School District has three schools: Palmer High School, Middle School, and Elementary School. Palmer built the current elementary school in 2015, leaving the old school for gym and cafeteria use. Palmer Elementary has over 350 students ranging from prekindergarten to third grade. The junior high and middle school were combined a few years earlier to become the Palmer Middle School, housing fourth through eight grades, with around 350 students. Palmer High School is the second-newest building and serves over 300 students between 9th and 12th grades. Palmer High School and Palmer Middle School have athletics ranging from 7th to 12th grades. Sports include track and field, basketball, football, baseball, softball, volleyball, cross country, and golf. Extracurricular activities include band and National Honor Society.

== Transportation ==
=== Major highways ===
- Interstate 45

=== Air ===
The city is served by the privately owned Dallas South Port Airport.

== Gallery ==
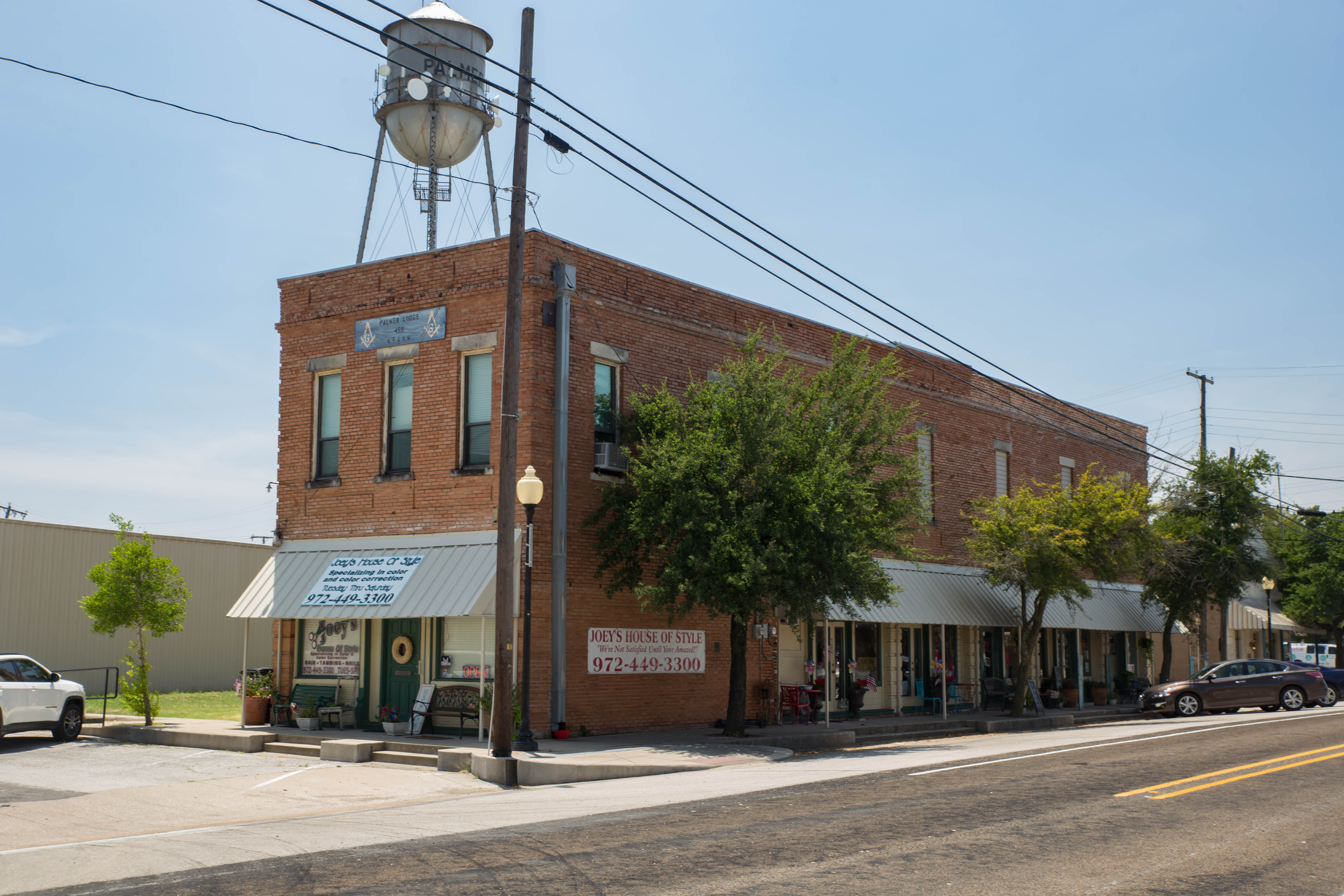
Joey's House of Style in Downtown Palmer

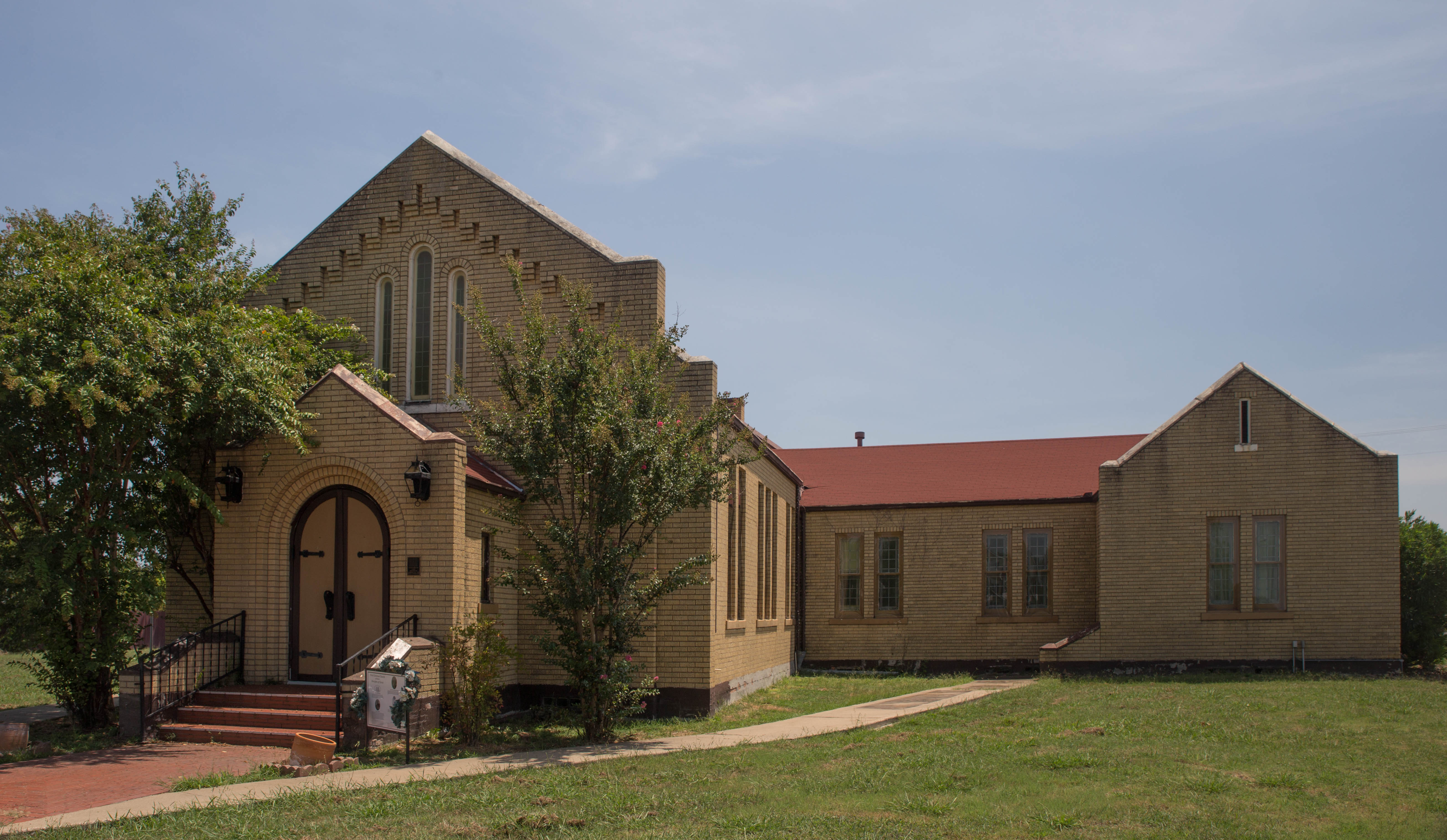
First Christian Church

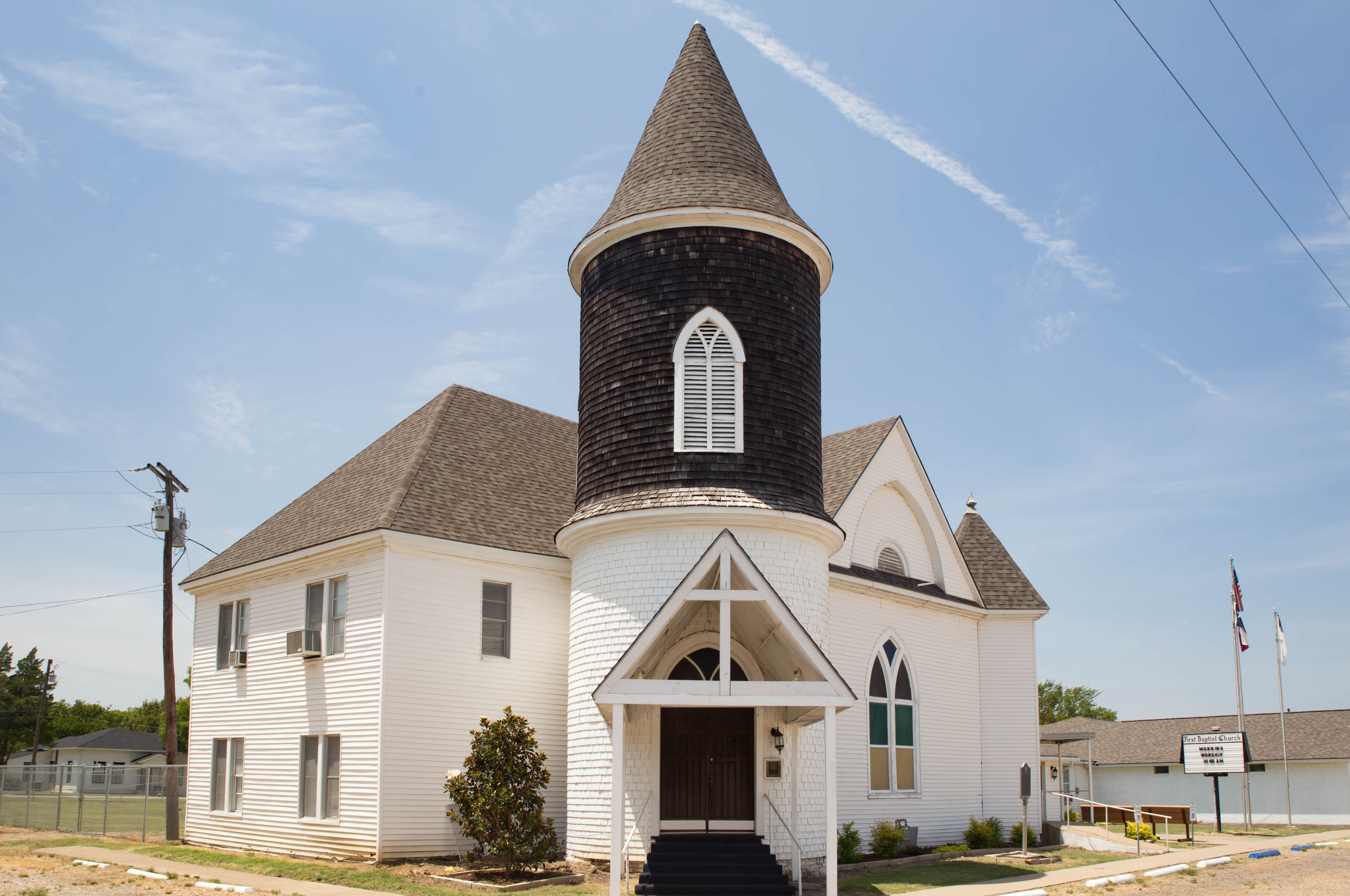
First Baptist Church
