= Distribuidor La Araña =

Highway interchange in Caracas, Venezuela

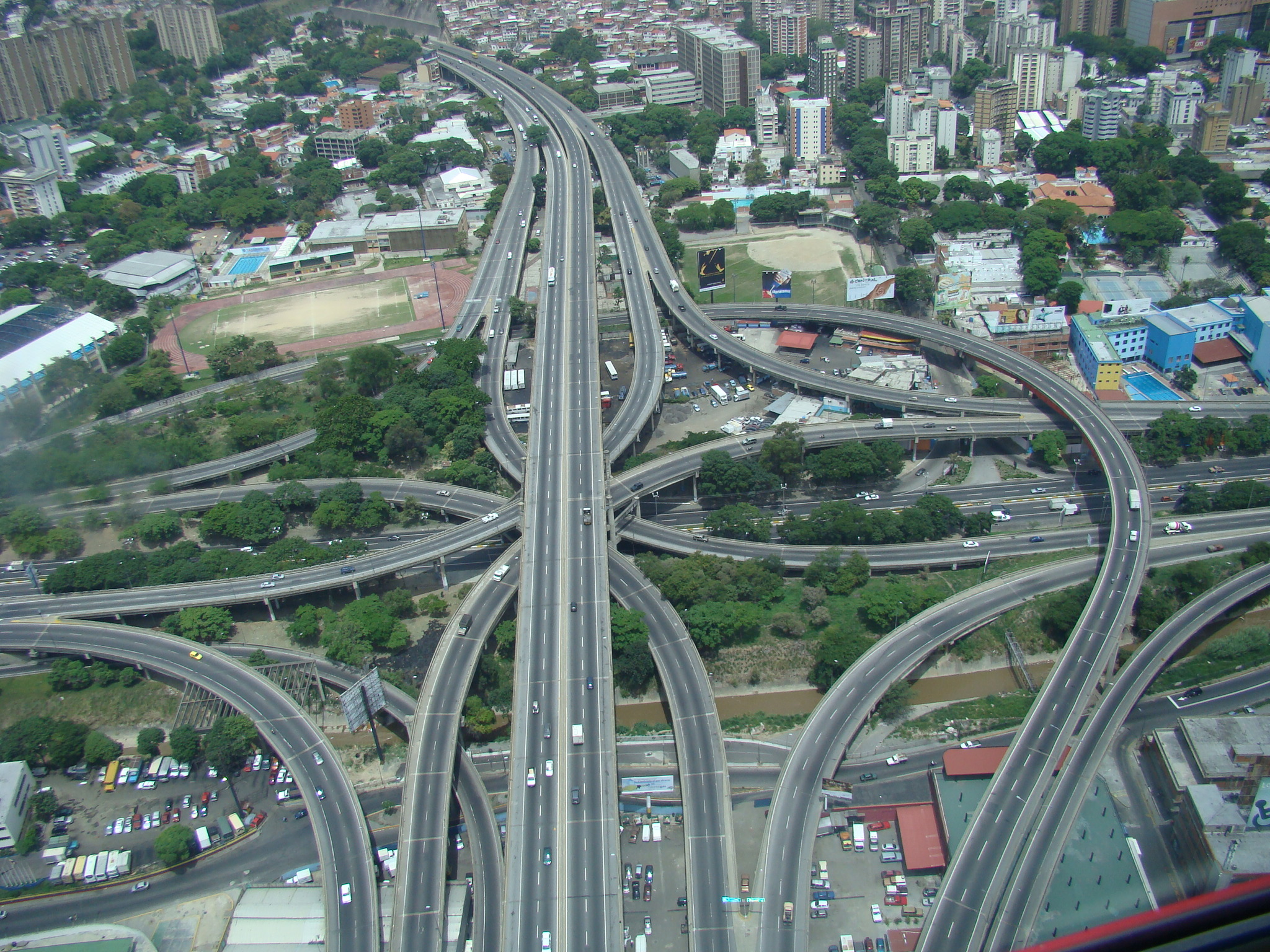

Location
- Libertador Municipality
- Roads at junction: North–South Highway/L-2; Grand Chieftain Guaicaipuro Highway/L-7

Construction
- Type: Interchange

Distribuidor La Araña (English: The Spider Interchange or The Spider Distributor) is a major interchange in the Libertador Municipality within Caracas, Venezuela. It is located in the eastern part of the Caracas metropolitan district. The interchange has undergone many modifications throughout its lifespan. It was constructed in multiple parts, starting in the 1950s and extending to the 1960s. In 2006, the interchange underwent rehabilitation works. In December 2014, a viaduct connecting the interchange to the Valle-Coche Highway was opened. It has been declared as an item of cultural significance.

== Description ==
The interchange is a crossing between the North–South Highway/L-2 and Grand Chieftain Guaicaipuro Highway/L-7. To the north of the interchange is Túnel La Planicie, a tunnel which leads to the southern end of the Caracas-La Guaira Highway. To the south of the interchange are Túnel El Paraíso and Túnel El Valle, two tunnels which lead to the Valle-Coche Highway/T-9.

Near the interchange is the Maternidad Caracas Metro station.
