= List of neighborhoods in Dallas =

The city of Dallas, Texas (US) is home to many areas, neighborhoods, and communities. The following is a list of neighborhoods placed within larger areas and sometimes communities.

For clarity, Dallas can be divided into several geographical areas which include macroneighborhoods, i.e., larger geographical sections of territory including many subdivisions or neighborhoods.

Downtown Dallas

Downtown Dallas
Baylor District	Mixed
The Cedars	Mixed
Civic Center District	Mixed
Dallas Arts District	Mixed
Dallas Farmers Market	Mixed
Deep Ellum	Mixed
Design District	Mixed
Main Street District	Mixed
Reunion District	Commercial
Riverfront District	Mixed
South Side	Mixed
Thanksgiving Commercial Center	Commercial
Uptown	Mixed
Victory Park	Mixed
West End Historic District	Mixed

East Dallas
website Alger Park/Ash Creek	Residential
Belmont	Residential
Buckner Terrace	Residential
Caruth Terrace	Residential
website Casa Linda Estates	Residential
Casa Linda Park	Residential
website Casa View	Residential
Casa View Haven	Residential
website Claremont	Residential
Claremont Park	Residential
Eastwood	Residential
Edgemont Park	Residential
Forest Hills	Residential
Gaston Park	Residential
website Greenland Hills	Residential
Hillridge	Residential
Hollywood Heights	Residential
Junius Heights	Residential
website Lake Park Estates	Residential
Lakewood	Residential
website Lakewood Heights	Residential
website Lakewood Trails	Residential
Little Forest Hills	Residential
Lochwood	Residential
Lower Greenville	Residential
North Stonewall Terrace	Residential
Old Lake Highlands	Residential
website Ridgewood Park	Residential
Santa Monica	Residential
Stonewall Terrace	Residential
University Meadows	Residential
website Vickery Place	Residential
website White Rock	Residential
Wilshire Heights	Residential
Old East Dallas
Baylor/Meadows	Mixed
Belmont Park	Residential
website Bryan Place	Residential
Deep Ellum	Entertainment
website Munger Place Historic District	Residential
Peak's Suburban Addition	Residential
website Swiss Avenue	Residential

Lake Highlands

Northeast Dallas
Abrams Place	Residential
Alexander's Village	Residential
Boundbrook Oaks Estates	Residential
Chimney Hill	Residential
Copperfield Community	Residential
Country Forest	Residential
Forest Highlands	Residential
Glen Oaks	Residential
Hamilton Park	Residential
Highlands West	Residential
Highland Meadows	Residential
High Oaks Addition	Residential
Jackson Meadow	Residential
website L Streets	Residential
Lake Highlands	Mixed
Lake Highlands Estates	Residential
Lake Highlands North	Residential
Lake Highlands Square	Residential
Lake Ridge Estates	Residential
website Merriman Park Estates	Residential
Merriman Park North	Residential
Moss Farm	Residential
Moss Meadows	Residential
website Northwood Heights	Residential
Oak Highlands	Residential
Oak Tree Village	Residential
Pebble Creek	Residential
Richland Park Estates	Residential
Rolling Trails	Residential
Royal Highlands	Residential
Royal Highlands Village	Residential
Stultz Road	Residential
Town Creek	Residential
Royal Lane Village	Residential
Walnut Creek Estates	Residential
website Whispering Hills	Residential
White Rock Valley	Residential
website Woodbridge	Residential
Woodlands on the Creek	Residential
University Manor	Residential
website University Terrace	Residential
website Urban Reserve	Residential

North Dallas

North Dallas
website Bent Tree	Residential
website Bluffview	Residential
website Devonshire	Residential
website Elm Thicket	Residential
website Greenway Parks	Residential
Preston Center	Commercial
website Preston Hollow	Residential
Vickery Meadows	Residential
Far North Dallas
website Bent Tree	Residential
website Preston Highlands	Residential
Timberglen	Residential
website Far North Dallas	Residential
website Melshire Estates	Residential
website Northwood Hills	Residential
Platinum Corridor	Commercial

Northwest Dallas

Northwest Dallas
Arlington Park	Residential
Asian Trade District	Commercial
Bachman	Mixed
Design District	Mixed
Love Field	Residential
website Midway Hollow	Mixed
Shannon Estates	Residential
Stemmons Corridor	Commercial

North Oak Cliff
website Bishop Arts District	Entertainment
website East Kessler Park	Residential
Kessler Highlands	Residential
website Kessler Park	Residential
website Kessler Plaza	Residential
Kessler Square	Residential
website Kidd Springs	Residential
website Kings Highway Conservation District	Residential
website L.O. Daniel	Residential
website Stevens Park Estates	Residential
website Stevens Park Village	Residential
website West Kessler	Residential
website Winnetka Heights	Residential
Oak Cliff
Arcadia Park	Residential
Beckley Club Estates	Residential
website Elmwood	Residential
Lake Cliff	Residential
Tenth Street Freedman's Town	Residential
Wynnewood	Residential
Redbird
Elderwoods/Elderoaks	Residential
Glenn Oaks	Residential
Wynnewood Hills	Residential
Western Park	Residential

Oak Lawn

Oak Lawn
Cityplace	Mixed
Uptown	Mixed
website International Center	Commercial
LoMac	Commercial
Knox Park	Mixed
website Perry Heights	Residential
State Thomas	Residential
website Turtle Creek	Mixed
website Oak Lawn	Mixed
website Victory Park	Mixed
website West Village	Mixed

Southeast Dallas
Arnold's Station	Residential
Buckner Park	Residential
Cedar Run	Residential
El Barrio (Little Mexico)	Residential
Elam	Residential
Fireside	Residential
Kleberg	Residential
Lake June	Residential
Parkdale	Residential
Pemberton Hill	Residential
Piedmont	Residential
Pleasant Grove	Residential
Pleasant Hills	Residential
Pleasant Mound	Residential
Riverway Estates/Bruton Terrace	Residential
Rylie	Residential
Seagoville/Dallas	Residential
Scyene	Residential
Spruce Square	Residential
Urbandale	Residential
Woodland Springs	Residential

Far South Dallas
Bonton	Residential
Dixon Circle	Residential
Highland Hills	Residential

South Central Dallas
Cedar Crest	Residential
Skyline Heights	Residential

Old South Dallas/Fair Park
Exposition Park	Mixed
Fair Park	Entertainment
Mill City	Residential
Owenwood	Residential
Jubilee Park	Residential
Dolphin Heights	Residential
Wheatley Place	Residential
Monterey Gardens	Residential\
Edgewood (see South Boulevard/Park Row)	Residential
South Boulevard/Park Row	Residential
Magnolia Park	Residential
Alta Park	Residential

West Dallas

West Dallas
Eagle Ford	Residential
website Greenleaf Village	Residential
La Bajada	Residential
La L'aceate	Residential
La Loma	Residential
Lake West	Residential
Ledbetter Gardens	Residential
Los Altos	Residential
Muncie	Residential
Western Heights	Residential
Westmoreland Heights	Residential
Trinity Grove	Residential
