= Whispering Hills, Dallas =

Whispering Hills
- Neighborhood
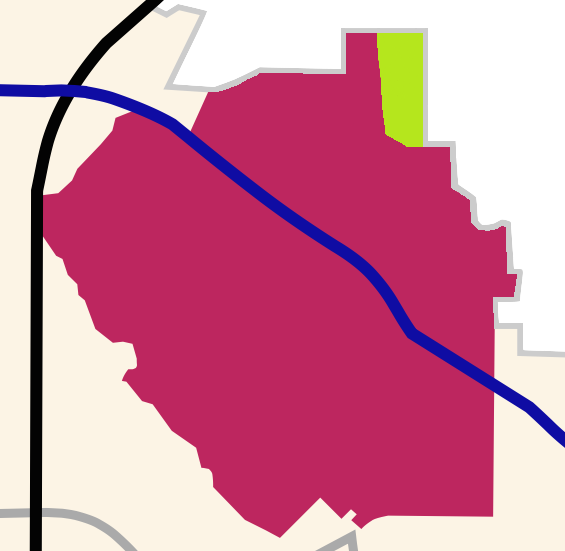
- Location within Lake Highlands in North Dallas

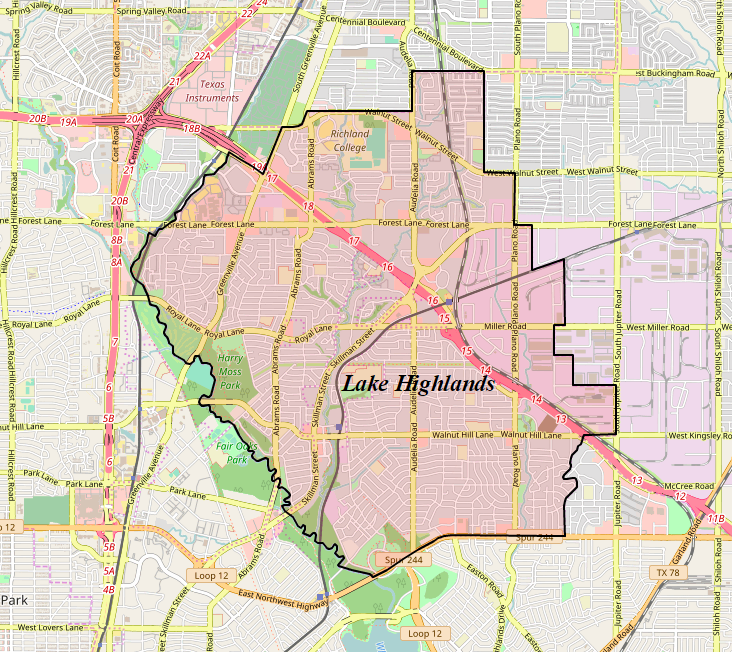
- Location within Lake Highlands in North Dallas
- Coordinates: 32.924163°N 96.709029°W
- Country: United States
- State: Texas
- County: Dallas
- City: Dallas
- Area: Lake Highlands
- Elevation: 660 ft (200 m)
- ZIP code: 75243
- Area codes: 214, 469, 972
- Website: http://www.whnadallas.com

Whispering Hills is a neighborhood consisting of 615 homes within the Lake Highlands neighborhood of Dallas, Texas (United States) adjacent to the suburbs of Richardson and Garland. It is generally bounded by Buckingham Rd along the Richardson border to the north, to the east by the Garland border near Plano Rd, to the south by Walnut St, and to the west by the KCS Railroad and Audelia Branch Greenbelt near Audelia Rd.

The neighborhood is conveniently located one mile north from I-635 and two miles east from US 75 (Central Expressway), with the Telecom Corridor surrounding the neighborhood.

Whispering Hills is the 5th largest neighborhood in Lake Highlands.

== Education ==
=== Public education ===
Whispering Hills, as well as most of Lake Highlands, is served by the Richardson Independent School District. Both Forestridge Elementary School and Liberty Junior High School are located within the neighborhood.

Elementary school

- Forestridge Elementary School

Middle school

- Liberty Junior High School

High schools

- Berkner High School
- Lake Highlands Freshman Center
- Lake Highlands High School

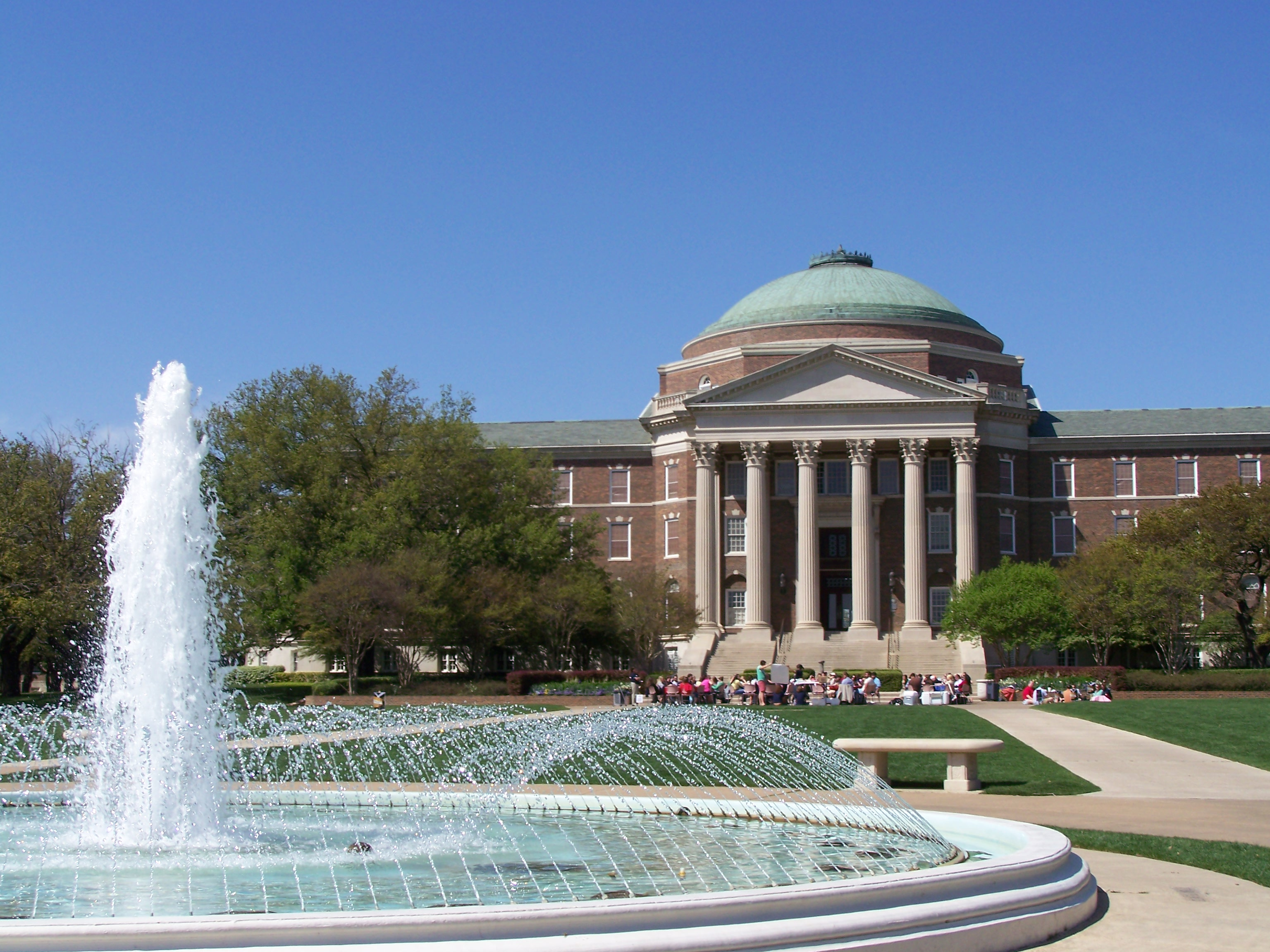
Dallas Hall at Southern Methodist University in University Park

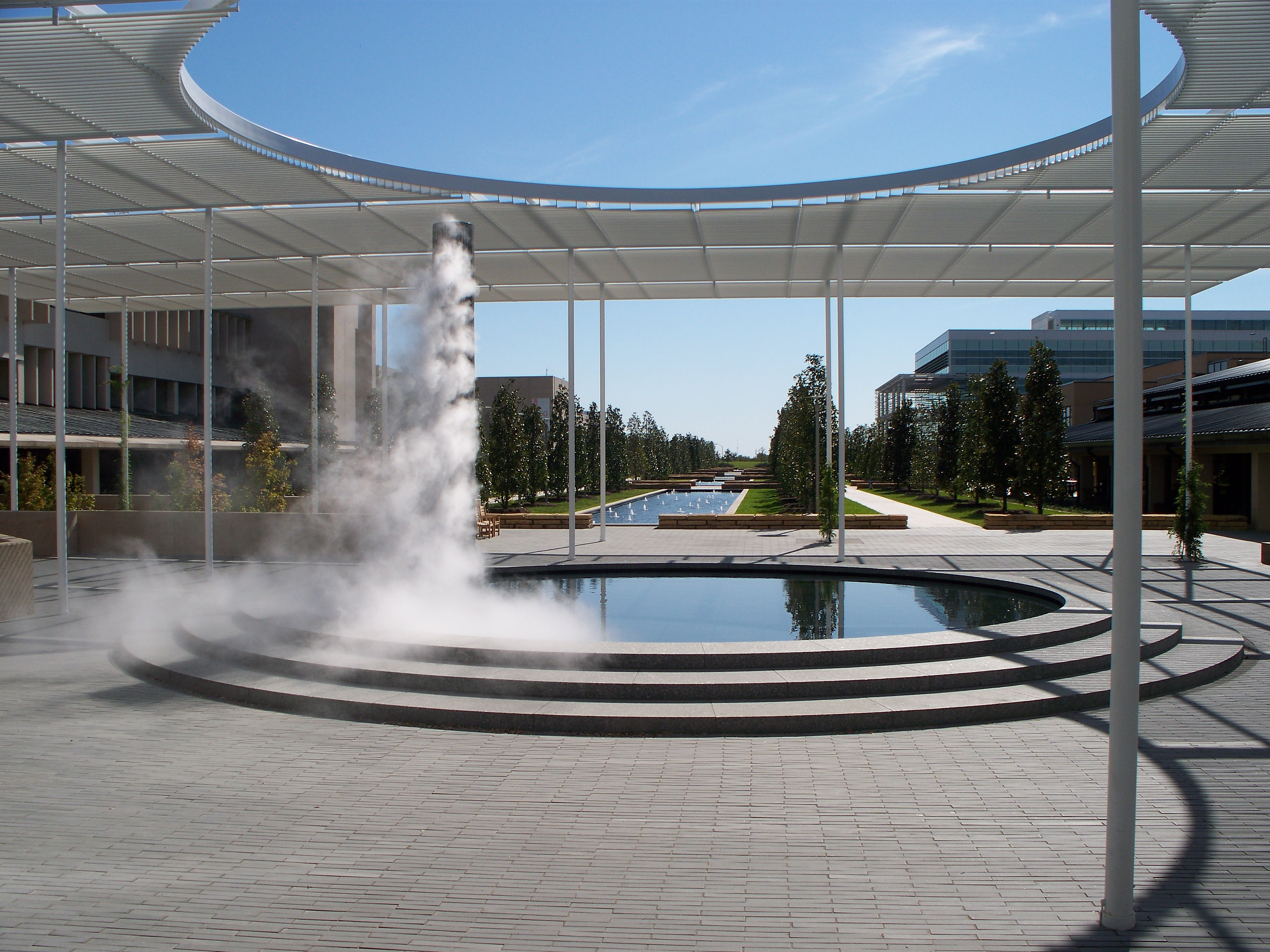
Campus Mall at The University of Texas at Dallas in Richardson

=== Colleges and universities ===
- Southern Methodist University (SMU) is a private university in University Park. SMU was founded in 1911 by the Southern Methodist Church and now enrolls 6,500 undergraduates, 1,200 professional students in the law and theology departments, and 3,500 postgraduates. According to sources such as the U.S. News & World Report, SMU is the best overall undergraduate college in the Dallas-Fort Worth Metroplex and the third best in the State of Texas. SMU is 15 minutes (9 miles) from Whispering Hills.
- The University of Texas at Dallas (UTD), part of the state public University of Texas System, is located in the city of Richardson and is in the heart of the Telecom Corridor. UT Dallas, or UTD, is renowned for its work in combining the arts and technology, as well as for its programs in engineering, computer science, economics, international political economy, neuroscience, speech and hearing, pre-health, pre-law and management. The university has many collaborative research relationships with UT Southwestern Medical Center. UT Dallas is home to approximately 21,145 students. UTD is also 15 minutes (7 miles) from the neighborhood.
- Richland College, part of the Dallas County Community College District, is located within Lake Highlands, a half-mile from Whispering Hills. The school was founded in 1972 and is the largest school in the DCCCD, featuring nearly 22,000 students. Richland is the only community college to receive the Malcolm Baldrige National Quality Award.

=== Public libraries ===
Dallas Public Library operates the Audelia Road Branch Library in Lake Highlands.

== Shopping ==
- NorthPark Center
- Galleria Dallas
- Lake Highlands Town Center

== Parks and recreation ==
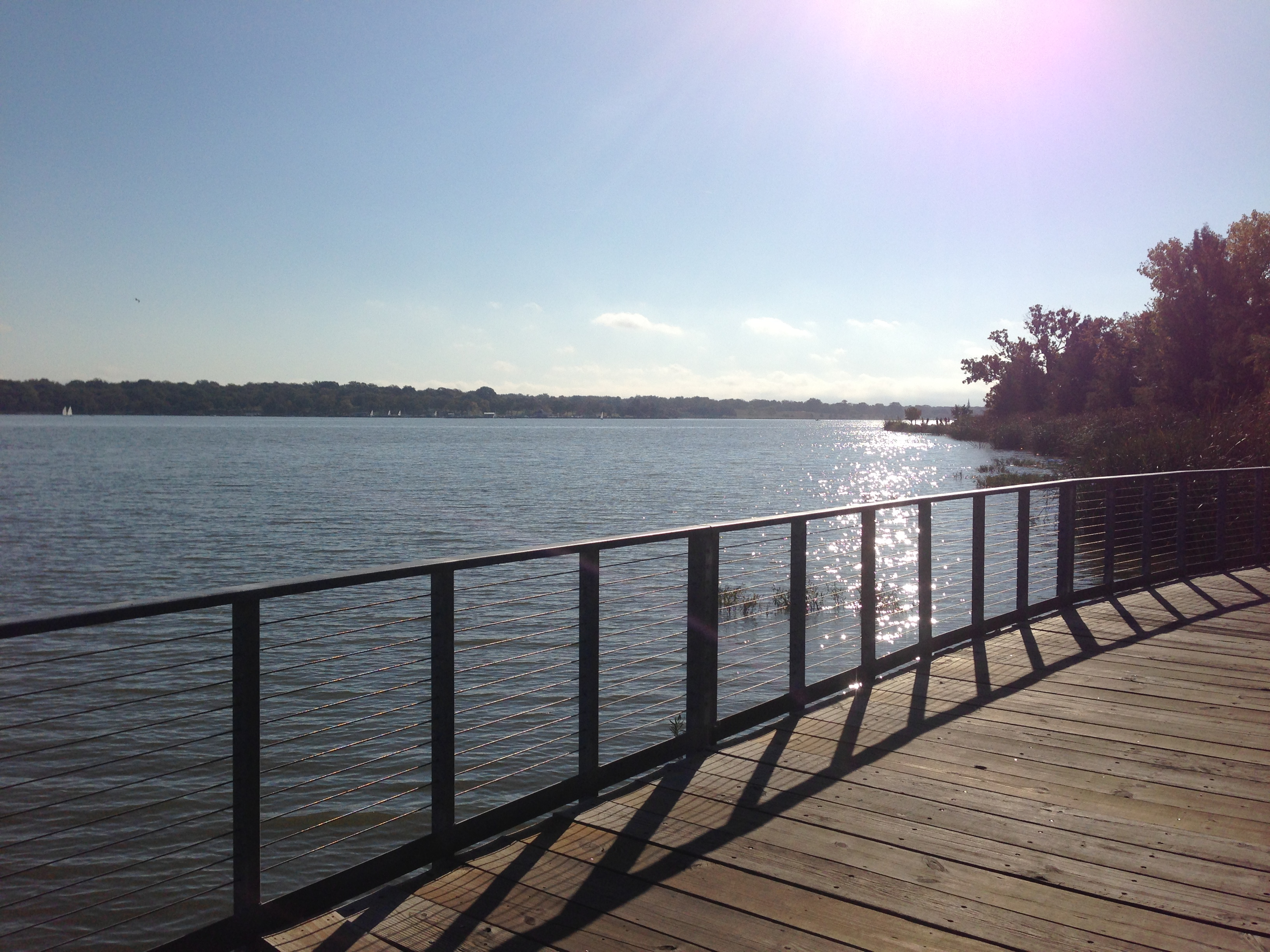
White Rock Lake, located on the south end of Lake Highlands

The City of Dallas operates Friendship Park which lies within Whispering Hills. The park includes trails, a basketball court, a picnic area and a playground, alongside 100 newly planted trees in the 10.8-acre park. Glenville Trail and Glenville Pool are located just to the north in the adjacent neighborhood of College Park on the Richardson side.

Residents of the neighborhood also have access to the track, football field, soccer field, and tennis courts at Liberty Junior High, along with the playgrounds and baseball field at Forestridge Elementary.

White Rock Lake is ten minutes south from Whispering Hills on Audelia Road. Recreational activities on the lake include kayaking, canoeing and standup paddleboarding, available by rental. The park surrounding the lake features a 9.33-mile trail for hiking, running and bicycling. The White Rock Lake Dog Park is also located on the north side of the lake on Mockingbird Lane.

== Economy ==
Lake Highlands is home to the headquarters of Texas Instruments (TI). TI is the No. 4 manufacturer of semiconductors worldwide after Intel, Samsung and Toshiba, and is the No. 2 supplier of chips for cellular handsets after Qualcomm, and the No. 1 producer of digital signal processors (DSPs) and analog semiconductors, among a wide range of other semiconductor products. TI is located two miles west of the neighborhood.

Major business areas near Lake Highlands include the Platinum Corridor, Preston Center, and the Telecom Corridor.

== Transportation ==
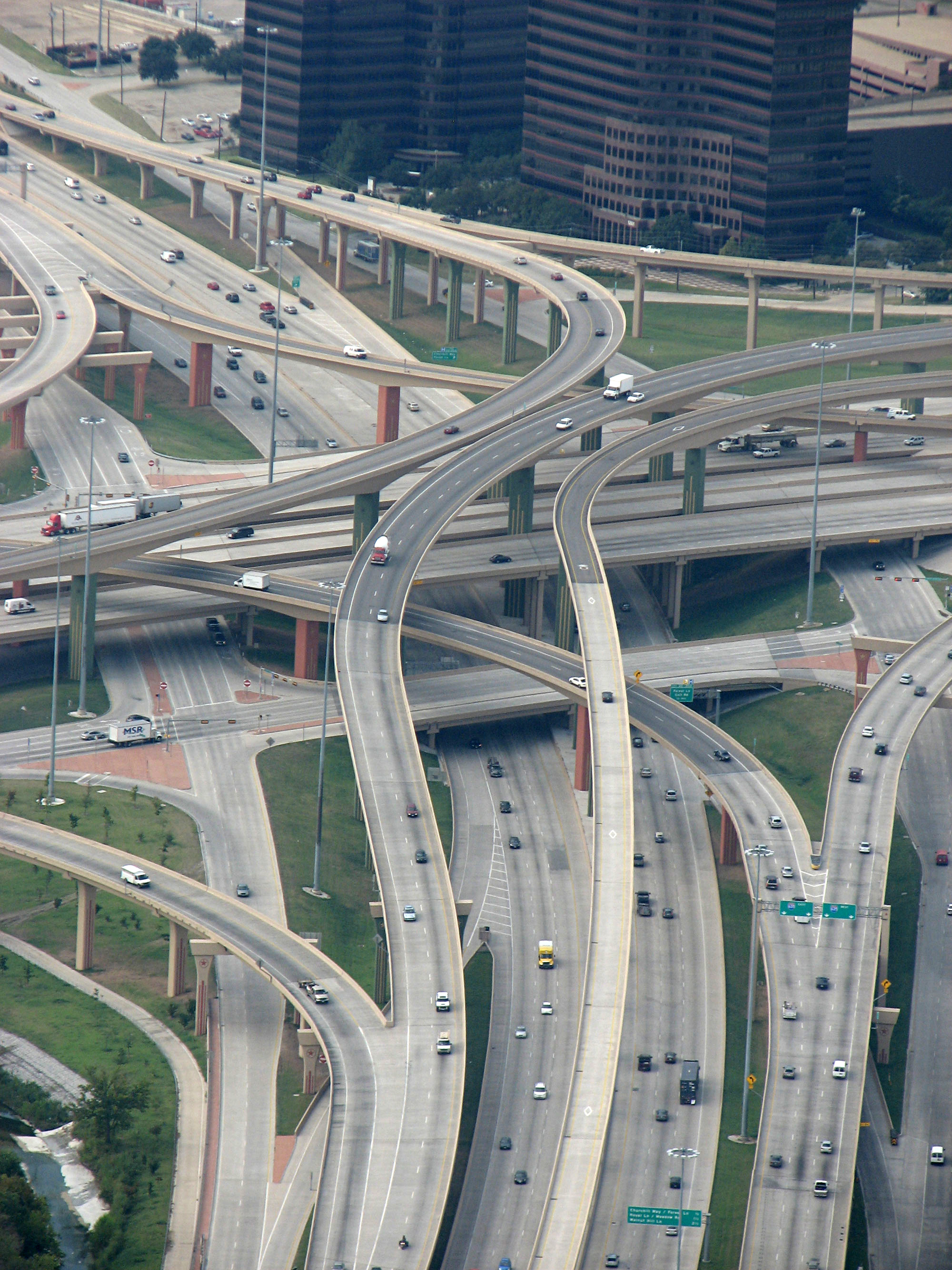
The Central Expressway and I-635 interchange near Lake Highlands, commonly known as the High Five Interchange.

The neighborhood benefits from its close proximity to the major High Five Interchange of I-635 and Central Expressway in North Dallas and in addition the Dallas Area Rapid Transit rail service.

=== Highways ===
The routing of limited-access highways through Lake Highlands is based on the area's proximity to Dallas' downtown freeway loop, as Dallas' freeway system was built according to the hub-and-spoke paradigm.

- U.S. Highway 75 (Central Expressway) runs northeast/southwest.

Additionally, two separate beltways arc across Lake Highlands: in order from their proximity to downtown:

- Northwest Highway (Loop 12)
- Interstate 635

=== Thoroughfares ===
Major thoroughfares include:

- Plano Road
- Audelia Road
- Abrams Road
- Greenville Avenue
- Skillman Street
- Royal Lane
- Beltline Road
- Spring Valley Road

=== Light rail ===
The neighborhood has access to four DART Rail stations, to the south and to the west, that are located less than five minutes away. The Red Line connects Lake Highlands to downtown, Uptown, Richardson and Plano. The Blue Line connects Lake Highlands to downtown, Uptown, East Dallas and Garland. The Orange Line runs to DFW Airport, Irving and Las Colinas, Carrollton, Farmers Branch, Victory Park, downtown, Uptown, Richardson and Plano.

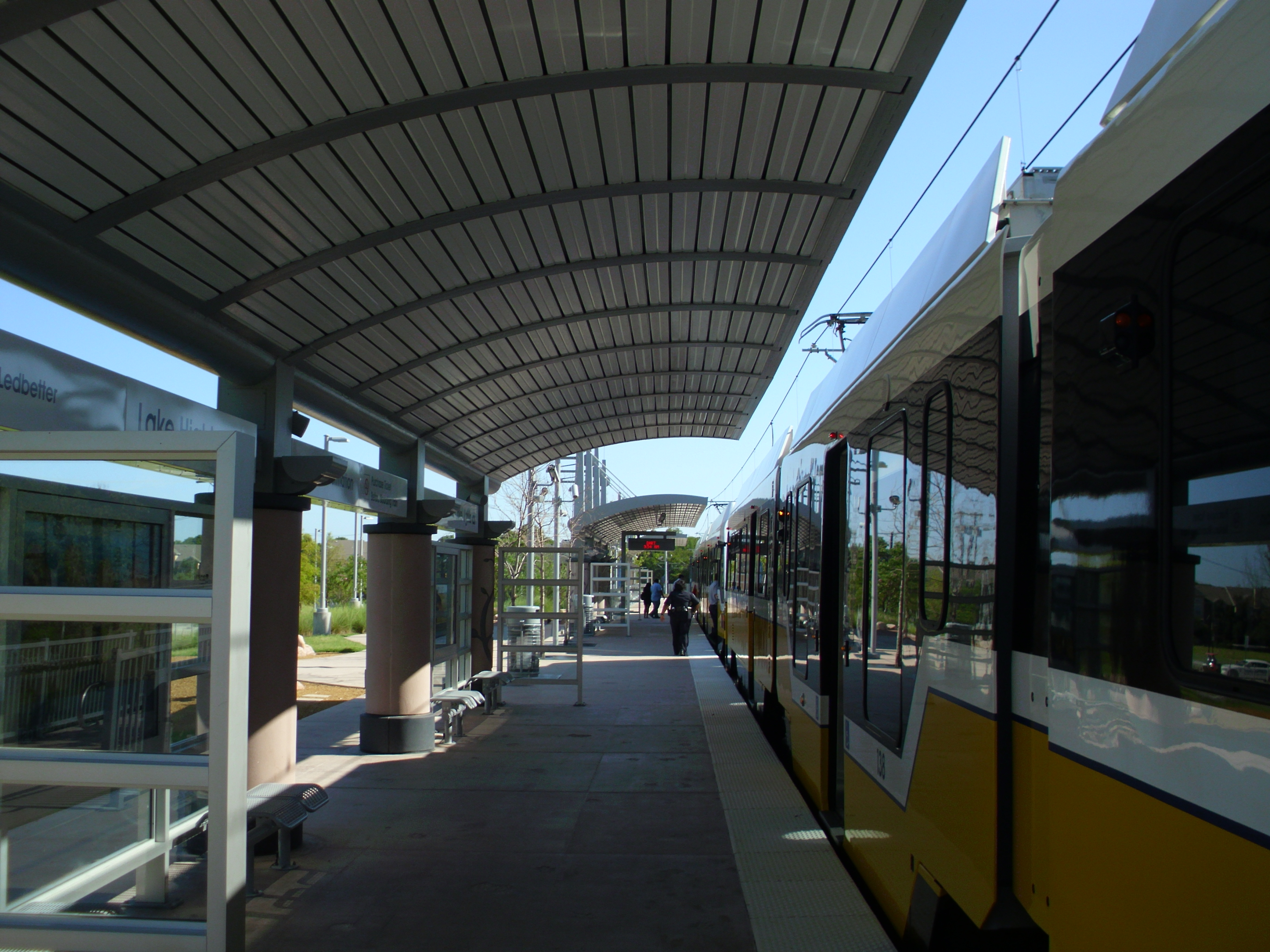
Lake Highlands Station

Lines and stations near Whispering Hills include:

- Blue Line

LBJ/Skillman Station, along I-635
Lake Highlands Station, along Skillman Street

- Red Line and Orange Line

Spring Valley Rail Station, along Central Expressway
LBJ/Central Station, along I-635 and TI Boulevard

== Media ==
The Dallas Morning News is the Dallas citywide newspaper.

"Lake Highlands Advocate Magazine" is a local community magazine and daily news blog.

"Lake Highlands Today" is a local community newspaper.
