= Forest Meadow, Dallas =

Forest Meadow
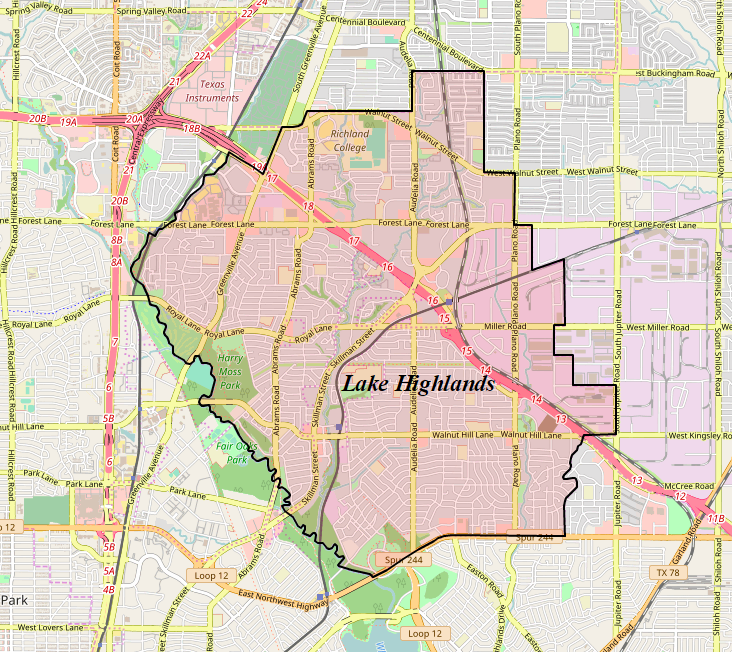
- Location within Lake Highlands in North Dallas
- Coordinates: 32.904553°N 96.742569°W
- Country: United States
- State: Texas
- Counties: Dallas
- City: Dallas
- Area: Lake Highlands
- ZIP code: 75243
- Area codes: 214, 469, 972

Forest Meadow is a suburban residential neighborhood within the Lake Highlands area of Dallas, Texas. The neighborhood is thought of today as being bounded by Greenville Avenue on the west, Whitehurst Drive on the south, Abrams Road on the east, and an alley demarcating the neighborhood from businesses and apartment blocks on Forest Lane to the north. However, the earliest plats identified by the name "Forest Meadows" were east of Abrams Road and some plats were south of Whitehurst Drive. These eastern areas are now generally considered part of Town Creek for neighborhood association purposes. Earlier plats used the name "Forest Meadows" and this nomenclature is also in use to describe neighborhoods in the area.

== History ==
Almost all of the land that today comprises the Forest Meadow, Moss Farm, and Town Creek neighborhoods of Dallas lay within the bounds of properties in the possession of pioneer settler James M. Houx (1822-1850), his wife Amanda L. Houx (1829-1847), and their son Nicholas T. Houx (1847-1890). James and Amanda Houx came to Dallas County, Texas, from Kentucky in 1846 or 1847, but Amanda died in childbirth when Nicholas was born on June 30, 1847. James M. Houx purchased a tract of 306 acres in this area from William M. Simpson and his wife Lettitia Simpson on October 27, 1849. However, James M. Houx had died by November of the next year when the federal census (1850) showed Nicholas as the adopted son of Judge John S. and Mrs. Hannah Thomas. Judge Thomas (the first County Judge in Dallas County) apparently assisted his young adopted son to receive a 640-acre land grant in the name of the "Heirs of James M. Houx, Deceased" from the State of Texas, given under a patent signed by Texas Governor Elisha Marshall Pease on February 28, 1855. The 1849 purchase of 306 acres did not fall within the present bounds of Forest Meadow, though it did include much of the area that is now Moss Farm. The larger grant of 640 acres in 1855 adjoined the earlier grant and it included almost all of the area that is now Forest Meadow and Town Creek.

Nicholas Houx lived on and farmed these two properties after he came to adulthood, when he was married to Mary Elizabeth Kemper (1850-1876, m. ca. 1874) and then to Maggie Bell Norman (1860-1935, m. 1878). From 1883 Nicholas and Maggie Houx began to sell parcels of the property, including substantial amounts of property in both of the earlier tracts to W. W. Sebastian (see the following paragraph), although Nicholas continued to live on the land until his death in February 1890, At least one portion of the land, including what is now the 9000 block of Windy Crest Drive, remained in the possession of the heirs of the Houx family until 1964.

William Whitesides Sebastian (1838-1898) eventually purchased land amounting to 640 acres and although this did not correspond to the earlier 640-acre tract noted above, his property included much of what is now Forest Meadow, Moss Farm, and Town Creek. He is considered to be a Dallas County pioneer, although of a later generation than the Houx family. Sebastian had served as a captain in the Civil War and had moved to Dallas County with his family in 1872. Sebastian lived on this land and not only cultivated cotton on it, but also utilized the land as a stock farm, raising Hereford and Holstein cattle. This pattern of use continued in the twentieth century when in 1940 Harry S. Moss purchased land that would later become Moss Farm and the Harry S. Moss Park and used the land as a stock farm.

The land was further subdivided after the time of the Sebastian family. The Houston & Texas Central Railroad (now the DART Red Line) had come through the area in 1873, and in the twentieth century, the land became more and more part of the growing city of Dallas. In 1916, the road that is now North Greenville Avenue adjacent to the neighborhood, previously called "Richardson Road," was designated as Texas State Highway 6. In 1926, the road was redesignated as US Highway 75 (Route 75) and remained so until North Central Expressway was constructed in the 1950s. In the early twentieth century small parcels were utilized as suburban farms where people who worked in Dallas could maintain a semblance of rural life. Dallas oil developer William A. "Bill" Browne (or Brown), for example, owned a suburban farm on 25 acres in the larger Houx survey that he had purchased in the 1940s and that is now part of Forest Meadow. This is now the subdivision of Forest Meadow platted as "Bill Browne's Farm," including Bill Browne Drive.

Between 1967 and 1984, the Dallas Cowboys practice field was located on Forest Lane adjacent to the neighborhood in the period when the neighborhood was being developed.

Suburban additions identified as "Forest Meadows" or now falling within the customary boundaries of Forest Meadow were platted between 1967 and 1978 as follows.

Year:	Subdivision:	Plat Book and Pages:	Area (or Streets) Included:
1967	Forest Meadows Addition 1	67193 p. 275	East of Abrams Road: Heatherdale, Meadowknoll, Hunters Creek
1969	Forest Meadows Addition 2	69185 p. 1999	East of Abrams Road
1971	Forest Meadows Addition 3	71076 p. 2070	South of Whitehurst and west of Club Meadow: Locarno, Seagrove, Raeford, Loma Vista
1973	Forest Meadows Addition 4	73020 p. 895	
1974	Forest Meadows Addition 5	74228 p. 678	Bounded by Dove Meadow, 9200 block of Windy Crest, Abrams Road, and Forest Meadow Junior High
1975	Forest Meadows Addition 5	76038 p. 472	(corrected plat?)
1976	Forest Meadows Addition 4, Phase 2		Parts of Arborside Drive and Loma Vista Drive
1976	Bill Browne’s Farm	76209 p. 1348	Bill Browne, 9100 block of Windy Crest, Webb Kay, Clayco, Dusti, Brady
1976	Topaz Estates	79011 p. 1140	9000 block of Windy Crest and Windy Crest Circle

In 1979, residents concerned about rising reports of crime in the neighborhood established a Neighborhood Crime Watch. In 1995 this group was incorporated as the Forest Meadow Crime Patrol (see external link below).

== Schools and Amenities ==
Although the neighborhood is part of the city of Dallas, Forest Meadow falls within the Richardson Independent School District. Neighborhood school children attend Moss Haven Elementary School, Skyview Elementary School, Stults Road Elementary, and Merriman Park Elementary School, Forest Meadow Junior High School, and Lake Highlands High School.

Neighborhood residents have access to DART (Dallas Area Rapid Transit) Rail by way of the Forest Lane DART Rail Station, less than a mile west of the neighborhood on Forest Lane. The neighborhood lies within close proximity of Harry S. Moss Park, which is an access point for the White Rock Creek Trail. The Cottonwood Trail, currently under construction, will have an access point at the Forest Lane DART Station.
