= Lake Highlands =

- Neighborhood of Dallas
- Nicknames: "L.H.", "The Highlands"
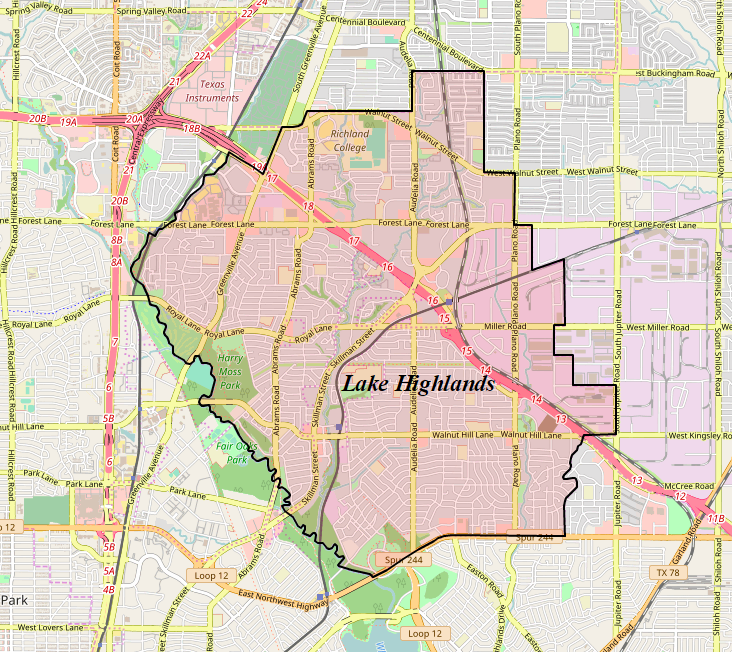
- Boundaries of Lake Highlands

- Location of the Lake Highlands area in Dallas
- Country: United States
- State: Texas
- Counties: Dallas
- City: Dallas

Area
  - Total: 14.6 sq mi (37.8 km^{2})
  - Land: 14.6 sq mi (37.8 km^{2})
  - Water: 0 sq mi (0 km^{2}) 0%
- Elevation: 571 ft (174 m)

Population (2023)
  - Total: 99,360
  - Density: 6,808/sq mi (2,628.5/km^{2})
- Demonym: Lake Highlander
- ZIP codes: 75231, 75238, 75243
- Area codes: 214, 469, 972
- Website: lhpid.org

Lake Highlands is a neighborhood constituting most of Northeast Dallas. The neighborhood is a collection of dozens of subdivisions served by Richardson ISD and Dallas ISD public schools, as well as an array of private schools.

== Geography ==
=== Overview ===
Lake Highlands touches Richardson on the north, Garland on the east, White Rock Lake and East Dallas on the south, and Lakewood and North Dallas on the west. The neighborhood is bisected from southeast to northwest by I-635 and from southwest to northeast by DART Blue Line. It is bordered on the south by Northwest Highway and White Rock Lake, and on the west by White Rock Creek or Central Expressway. On the north and east, the neighborhood ends at the city limits of Richardson and Garland.

=== Compass ===
Relation of Lake Highlands to other places:

Lake Highlands is situated due North of White Rock Lake and East of North Central Expressway.

=== Topography ===
The neighborhood differs from much of Dallas and the surrounding area, which is fairly flat. Lake Highlands has hills and valleys, with street elevations that can vary by 50 feet, which offer scenic views of downtown Dallas.

White Rock Lake, a reservoir constructed at the beginning of the 20th century, is located on the south side of Lake Highlands. The lake and surrounding park is a popular destination for boaters, rowers, joggers, and bikers, as well as visitors seeking peaceful respite from the city at the 66-acre (267,000 m^{2}) Dallas Arboretum and Botanical Garden, located on the lake's eastern shore. White Rock Creek feeds into White Rock Lake, and then exits on to the Trinity River southeast of downtown Dallas. Trails along White Rock Creek are part of the extensive Dallas County Trails System.

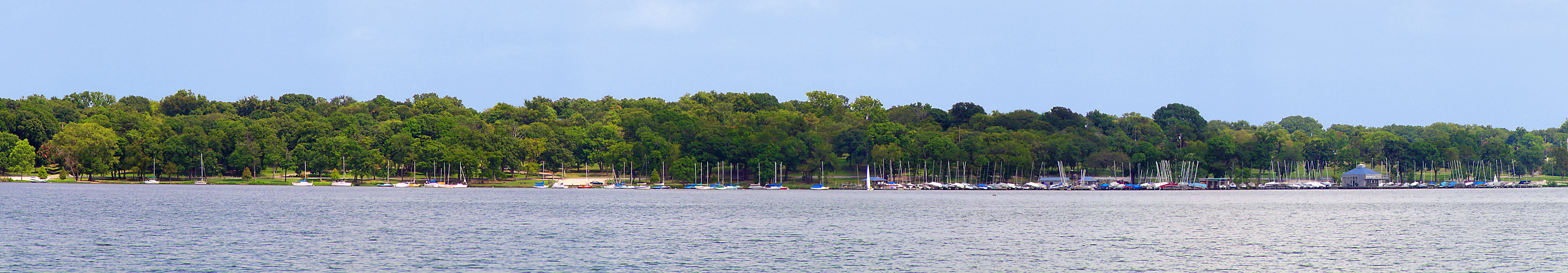
White Rock Lake

== Subdivisions ==
The following neighborhoods are generally considered part of or closely connected with Lake Highlands.

- Abrams Place
- Alexander's Village
- Boundbrook Oaks Estates
- Candlewood Creek
- Caribbean Estates
- Chimney Hill
- Copperfield Community
- Country Forest
- Creekside at Lake Highlands
- Enclave at Vanguard Way
- Forest Highlands
- Forest Meadow
- Glen Oaks
- Hamilton Park
- Highlands West
- Highland Meadows
- High Oaks Addition
- Jackson Meadow
- L Streets
- Lake Highlands Estates
- Lake Highlands North
- Lake Highlands Square
- Lake Highlands Village West
- Lake Ridge Estates
- Lovely Place Commons
- Merriman Park Estates
- Merriman Park North
- Moss Farm
- Moss Meadows
- Northwood Heights
- Oak Highlands
- Oak Tree Village
- Pebble Creek
- Richland Park
- Richland Park Estates
- Rolling Trails
- Royal Highlands
- Royal Highlands Village
- Royal Lane Village
- Stults Road
- Town Creek
- Walnut Creek Estates
- Whispering Hills
- White Rock Valley
- Woodbridge
- Woodlands on the Creek
- University Terrace
- Urban Reserve

== Demographics ==
A total of 87,860 people lived in the neighborhood's 14.60 square miles, according to the 2014 U.S. census estimate—averaging 6018 people per square mile. The median age for residents was 34.7.

According to the 2014 Census estimate, 48.2% of the population was White, 30.8% was Black, 6.0% Asian, 15.0% from two or more races. 24.6% of the total population was of Hispanic or Latino origin.

48.8% of residents are male, 51.2% are female. 72.5% are age 18 or over. 34.6% have never been married, 50.0% are married, 4.5% are widowed, and 10.9% are divorced.

The median household income in 2016 was $44,539. 31.8% of Lake Highlands homes are detached, single-family houses. The median owner-occupied home value is $266,181. The average household size is 2.38. Homeowners occupied 39.7% of the housing units, and renters occupied the rest.

== Education ==
Lake Highlands residents aged 25 and older holding a four-year degree amounted to 36.6% of the population in 2016, considered high when compared with the city and the county as a whole, as were the percentages of residents with a bachelor's or a postgraduate degree.

=== Public education ===
The Lake Highlands area is one of few areas in Dallas not within the Dallas Independent School District; most of the area is served by the Richardson Independent School District. The RISD portion of Lake Highlands is served by the following schools:

Elementary schools

- Aikin Elementary School
- Audelia Creek Elementary School
- Hamilton Park Pacesetter Elementary School
- Forestridge Elementary School
- Forest Lane Academy
- Lake Highlands Elementary School
- Merriman Park Elementary School
- Moss Haven Elementary School
- Northlake Elementary School
- Skyview Elementary School
- Stults Road Elementary School
- Thurgood Marshall Elementary School
- Wallace Elementary School
- White Rock Elementary School

Middle schools

- Forest Meadow Junior High School
- Lake Highlands Junior High School
- Liberty Junior High School

High schools

- Berkner High School
- Lake Highlands High School

=== Colleges and universities ===
- Richland College, part of the Dallas County Community College District, is located within Lake Highlands. The school was founded in 1972 and is the largest school in the DCCCD, featuring nearly 22,000 students. Richland is the only community college to receive the Malcolm Baldrige National Quality Award.

Nearby universities

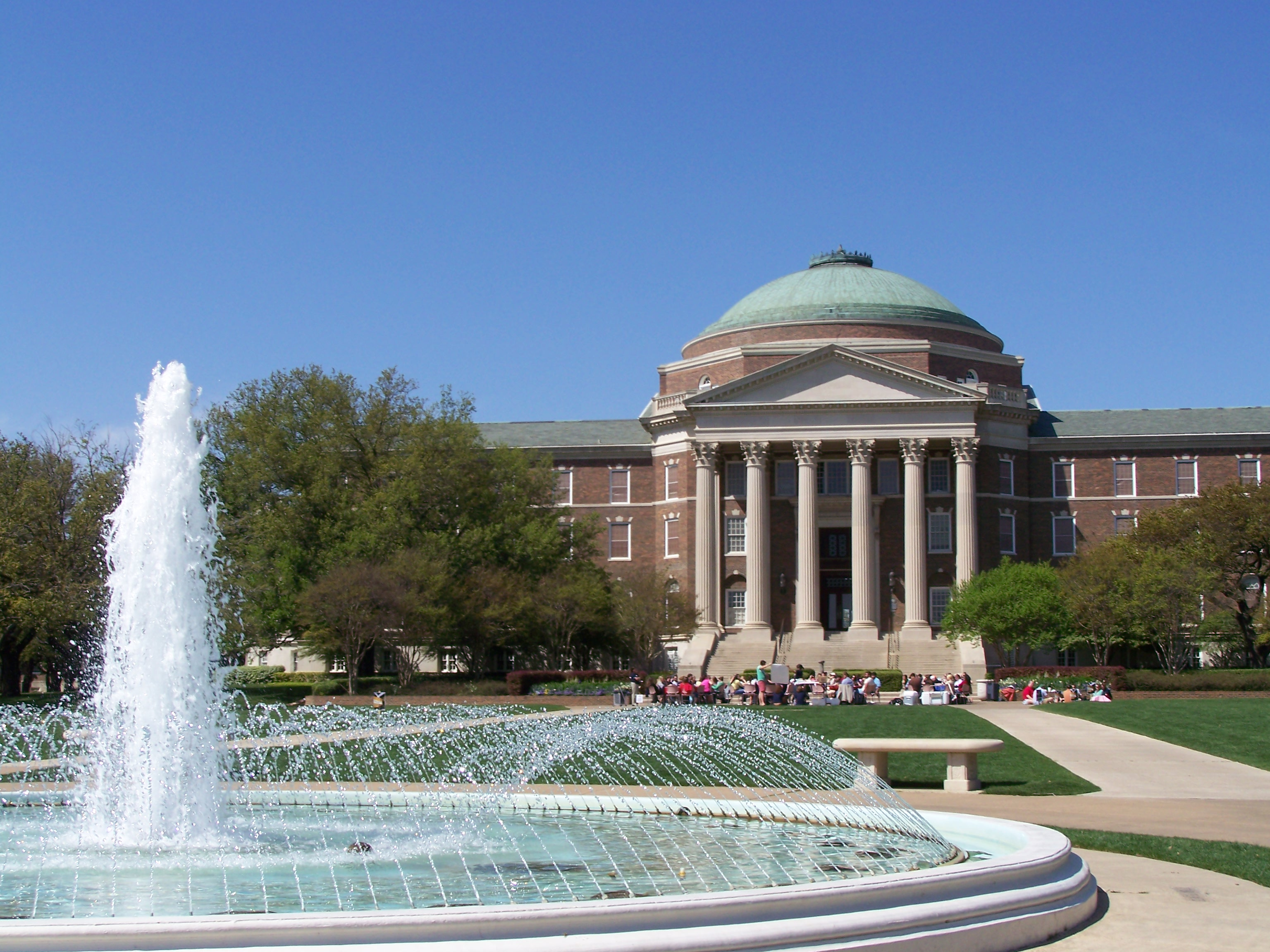
Dallas Hall at Southern Methodist University in University Park

- Southern Methodist University (SMU) is a private university in University Park. SMU is the closest university to Lake Highlands, which is home to many of the school's alumni. SMU was founded in 1911 by the Southern Methodist Church and now enrolls 6,500 undergraduates, 1,200 professional students in the law and theology departments, and 3,500 postgraduates. According to sources such as the U.S. News & World Report, SMU is the best overall undergraduate college in the Dallas-Fort Worth Metroplex and the third best in the State of Texas.
- The University of Texas at Dallas (UTD), part of the state public University of Texas System, is located in the city of Richardson and is in the heart of the Telecom Corridor. UT Dallas, or UTD, is renowned for its work in combining the arts and technology, as well as for its programs in engineering, computer science, economics, international political economy, neuroscience, speech and hearing, pre-health, pre-law and management. The university has many collaborative research relationships with UT Southwestern Medical Center. UT Dallas is home to nearly 27,000 students.

== Nonprofits ==
- Forerunner Mentoring Program is a non-profit specifically dedicated to serving the neighborhood of Lake Highlands. For over 10 years, Forerunner Mentoring has been providing mentorship for boys growing up without a father-figure in the home. What started as just a one-to-one mentoring organization has expanded to additionally provide after-school mentoring programs for K-8th grade boys, a high school ministry for young men, and a women's ministry for the single mothers of the students they serve.

== Shopping ==
- Lake Highlands Town Center

Nearby shopping

- NorthPark Center
- Galleria Dallas
- Preston Hollow Village
- Upper Greenville

== Recreation and parks ==
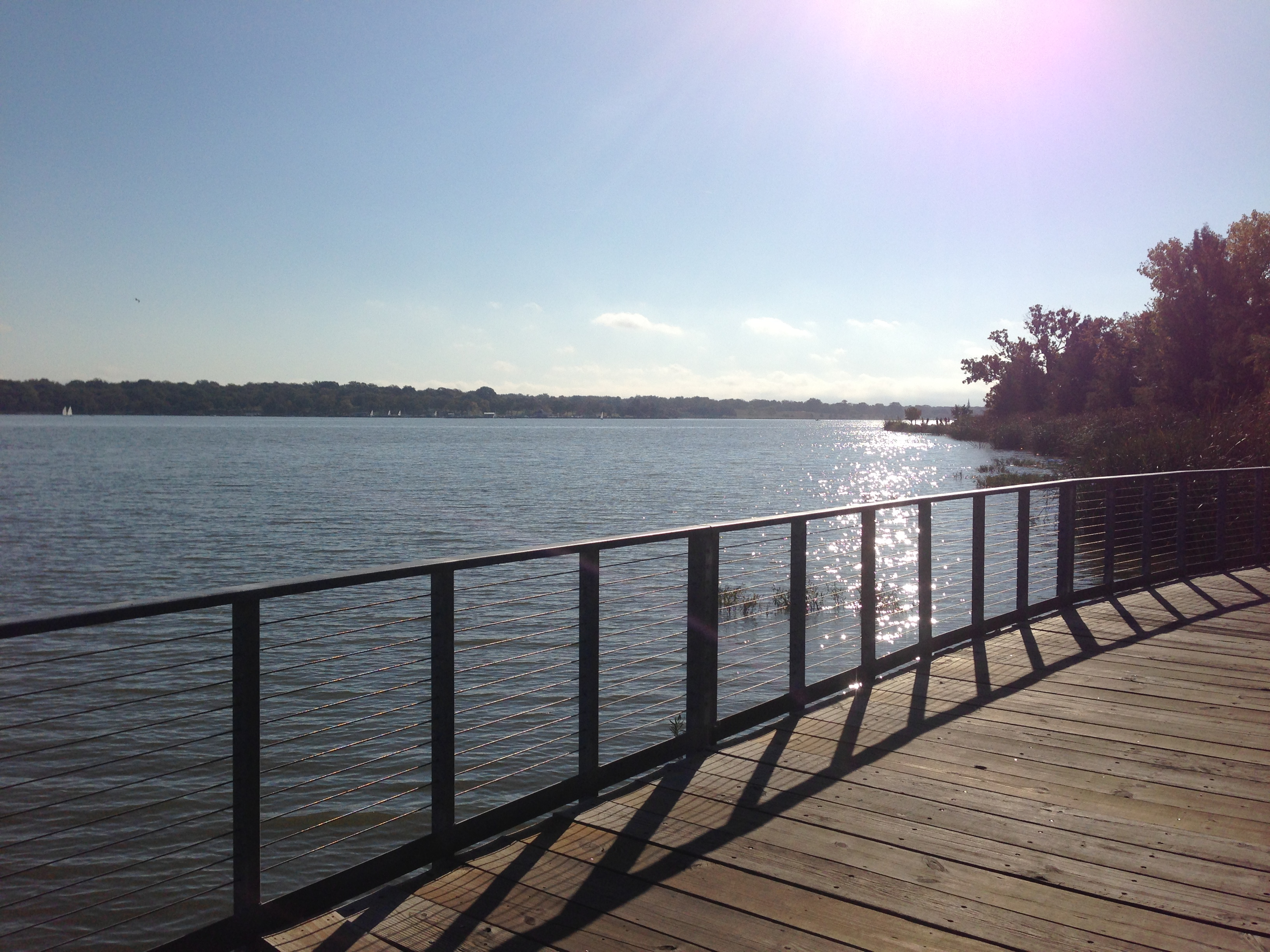
White Rock Lake, located on the south end of Lake Highlands

White Rock Lake is located on the south end of Lake Highlands. Recreational activities on the lake include kayaking, canoeing and standup paddleboarding, available by rental. The park surrounding the lake features a 9.33 mile trail for hiking, running and bicycling. The White Rock Lake Dog Park is also located on the north side of the lake on Mockingbird Lane.

== Government and infrastructure ==
Lake Highlands is represented by District 10 on the Dallas City Council; its current Councilmember is Kathy Stewart. In the Texas Senate, the area is represented by Senate District 16 (currently held by Democrat Nathan M. Johnson), while in the Texas House of Representatives, it is divided between House District 102 (Democrat Ana-Maria Ramos), and House District 108 (Republican Morgan Meyer).

The United States Postal Service operates the Lake Highlands Post Office, Northlake Post Office, and Richland Post Office within the Lake Highlands area.

== Economy ==
Lake Highlands is home to the headquarters of Texas Instruments (TI). TI is the No. 4 manufacturer of semiconductors worldwide after Intel, Samsung and Toshiba, and is the No. 2 supplier of chips for cellular handsets after Qualcomm, and the No. 1 producer of digital signal processors (DSPs) and analog semiconductors, among a wide range of other semiconductor products.

Major business areas near Lake Highlands include the Platinum Corridor, Preston Center, and the Telecom Corridor.

== Libraries ==
Lake Highlands is principally served by the Audelia Road Branch and Forest Green Branch of the Dallas Public Library. The Audelia Road Branch, built on its current site in 1971, was renovated and expanded in 2004.

== Transportation ==
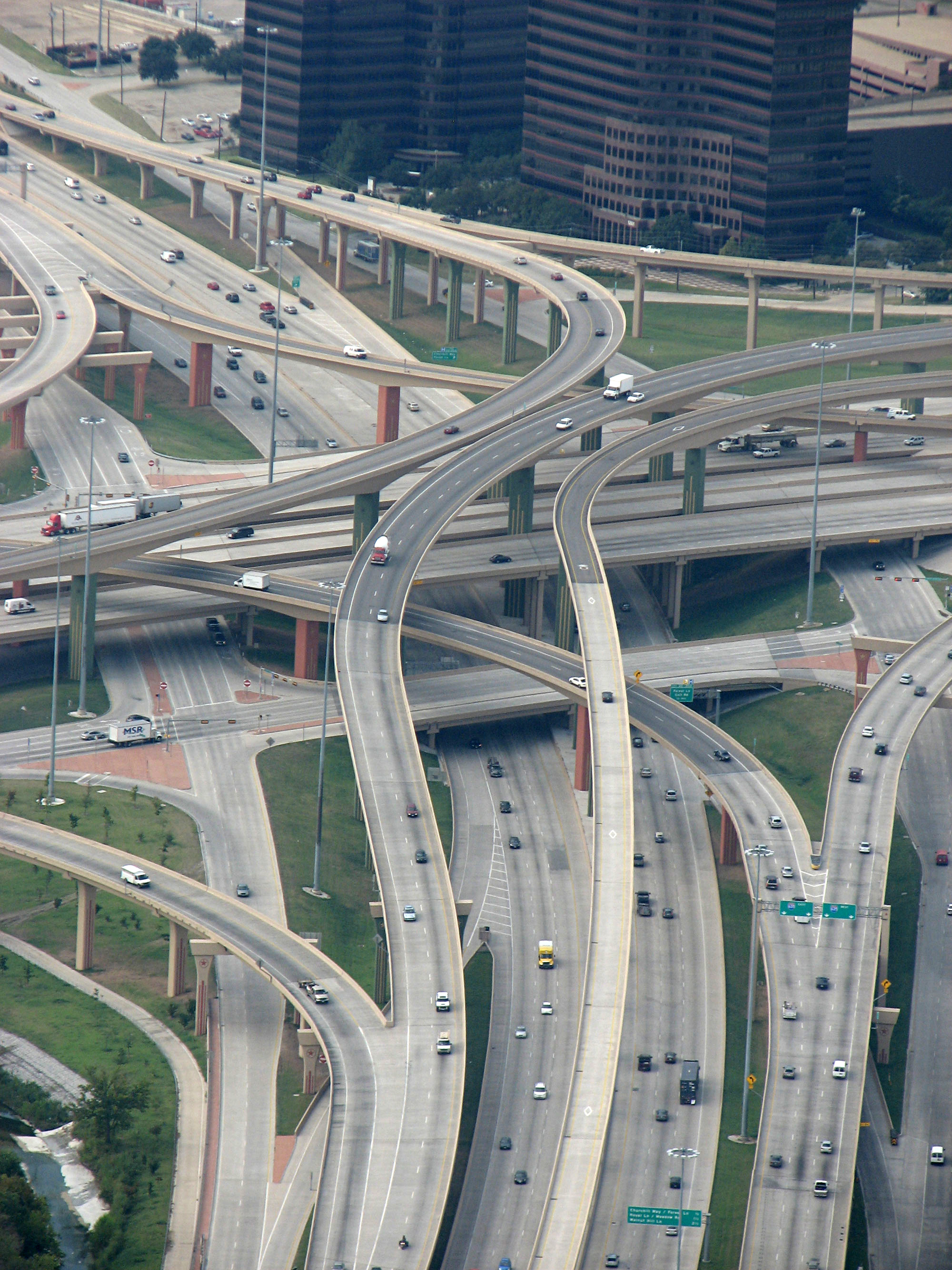
The Central Expressway and I-635 interchange near Lake Highlands, commonly known as the High Five Interchange.

As the majority of Lake Highlands was developed in the late 20th century, the primary mode of local transportation is the automobile and the area has a low density compared with neighborhoods built in the early 20th century. Efforts made by the City of Dallas and Dallas Area Rapid Transit to increase the availability of alternative modes of transportation have received varying degrees of support from residents of Lake Highlands. Since 1996, two light rail lines flanking Lake Highlands have been constructed and well received.

Lake Highlands' road network was developed according to the street hierarchy school of urban design. Roads in the area are separated into major limited-access highways, high-capacity principal arterial roads, mid-capacity minor arterial roads, mid-capacity collector roads, and minor streets. The most organized of these systems is Lake Highlands' modified grid plan of principal arterial roads, which runs on a standard N/S/E/W grid.

=== Highways ===
The routing of limited-access highways through Lake Highlands is based on the area's proximity to Dallas' downtown freeway loop, as Dallas' freeway system was built according to the hub-and-spoke paradigm.

- U.S. Highway 75 (Central Expressway) runs northeast/southwest.

Additionally, two separate beltways arc across Lake Highlands: in order from their proximity to downtown:

- Northwest Highway (Loop 12)
- Interstate 635

=== Thoroughfares ===
Major thoroughfares include:

- Abrams Road
- Audelia Road
- Greenville Avenue
- Royal Lane
- Skillman Street
- Forest Lane
- Walnut Hill Lane
- Walnut Street
- Plano Road

=== Light rail ===
DART's light rail system began serving Lake Highlands in 2001. The Red Line connects Lake Highlands to downtown, Uptown, Richardson, and Plano. The Blue Line connects Lake Highlands to downtown, Uptown, East Dallas, and Garland. The Orange Line runs to DFW Airport, Irving and Las Colinas, Dallas Love Field, the Medical District, Victory Park, downtown, Uptown, Richardson, and Plano.

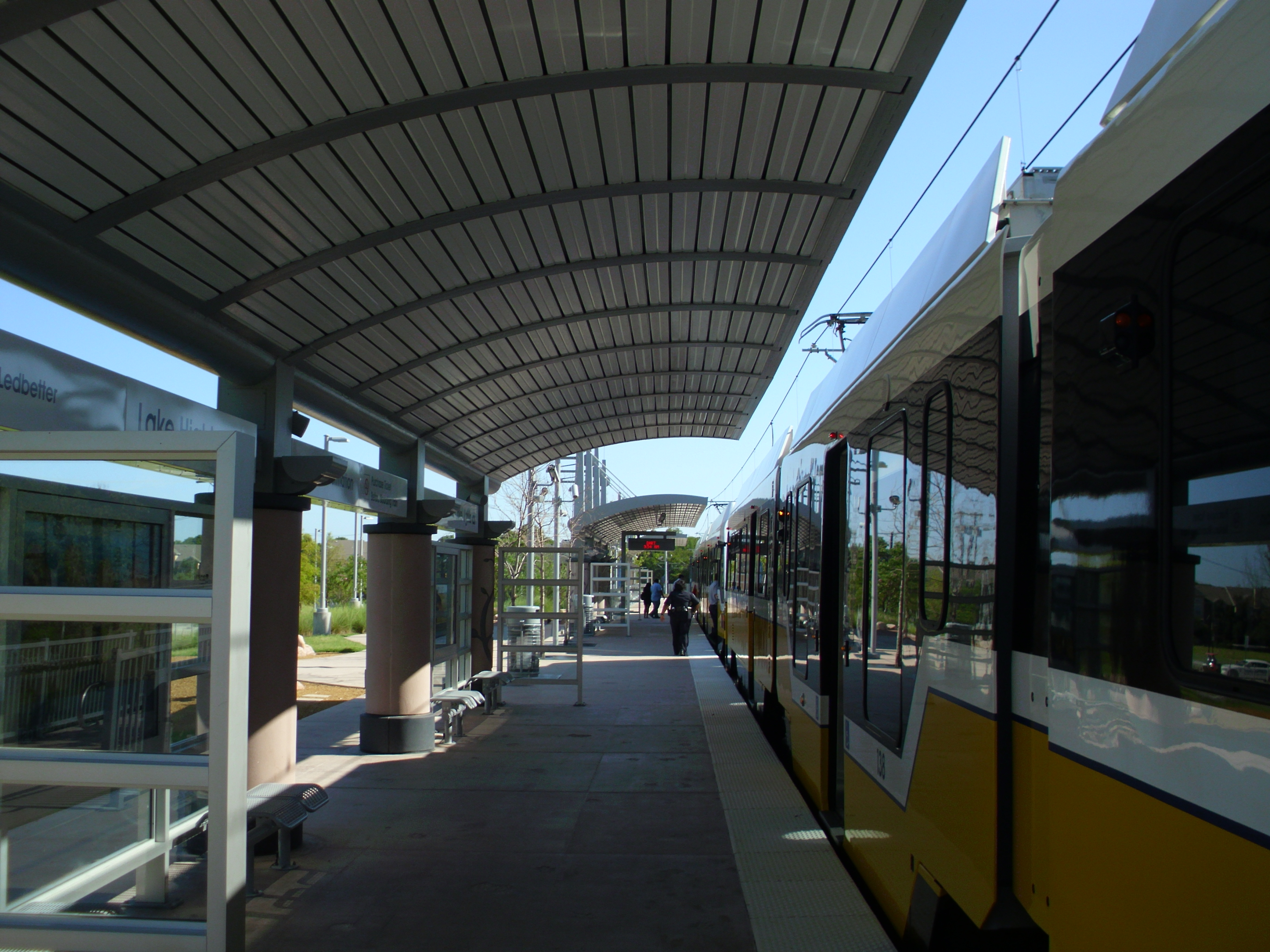
Lake Highlands Station

Lines and stations in Lake Highlands include:

Blue

- White Rock Station
- Lake Highlands Station
- LBJ/Skillman Station

Red Orange

- Forest Lane Station
- LBJ/Central Station

== Notable Lake Highlanders ==
- Merton Hanks - NFL Pro Bowl and Super Bowl champion defensive back for the San Francisco 49ers football team
- Annie Clark - Grammy Award-winning singer songwriter who performs as St. Vincent
- Mark Salling - actor on the television show Glee
- C.B. Hudson - lead guitarist for the rock band Blue October
- Chris Harrison - Host of the TV show "The Bachelor"
- Dan Beebe - former commissioner of the Big 12 Conference
- Morgan Fairchild - Film and Television Actor
- Gibby Haynes - Lead singer of the band Butthole Surfers and son of "Mr. Peppermint"
- Jerry Haynes - aka "Mr. Peppermint", actor and host of long running (1961- 1996) Dallas-based children's television program, Mr. Peppermint Place
- Tony Liscio – NFL Super Bowl champion offensive tackle for the Dallas Cowboys
