= Woodbridge, Dallas =

Woodbridge
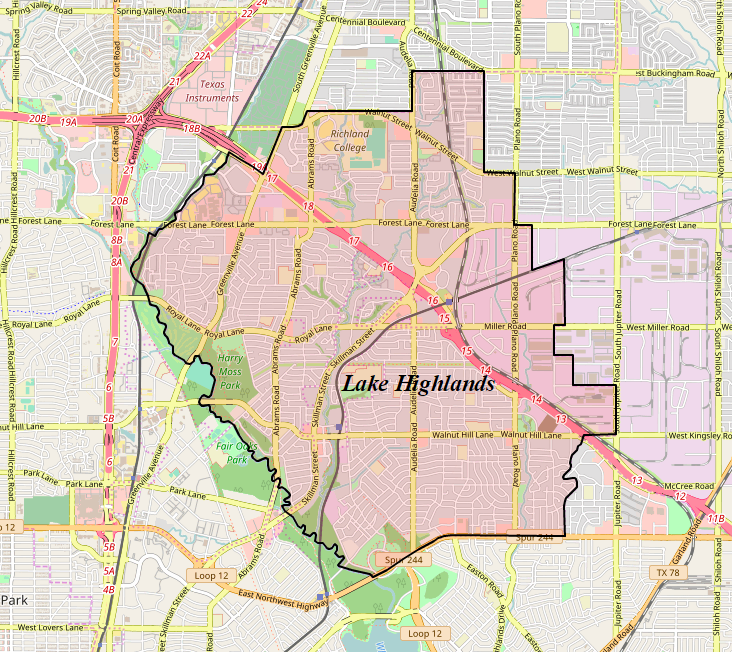
- Location within Lake Highlands in North Dallas
- Coordinates: 32.913256°N 96.713960°W
- Country: United States
- State: Texas
- Counties: Dallas
- City: Dallas
- Area: Lake Highlands
- Elevation: 576 ft (176 m)
- ZIP code: 75243
- Area codes: 214, 469, 972

Woodbridge is a neighborhood of 229 homes in the Lake Highlands neighborhood of Dallas, Texas (USA) near the border with Richardson. Its borders are roughly: to the west Audelia Road, to the south by Forest Lane, to the north by Shadow Way, and to the east by railroad tracks.

Many corporations and the Telecom Corridor are within close proximity. The Dallas Galleria is also just a short drive west on I-635.

== Education ==
It is served by the Richardson Independent School District. The school zoning has changed with the addition of Audelia Creek Elementary. The area used to be served by Aikin Elementary, Forest Meadow Junior High, and Lake Highlands High School. However, the zoning is now Audelia Creek Elementary, Liberty Junior High, and Berkner High School.

== Transportation ==
The area benefits from its close location to the major High Five Interchange of I-635 and US 75 (Central Expressway) in north Dallas.
