= Alexander's Village, Dallas =

Alexander's Village
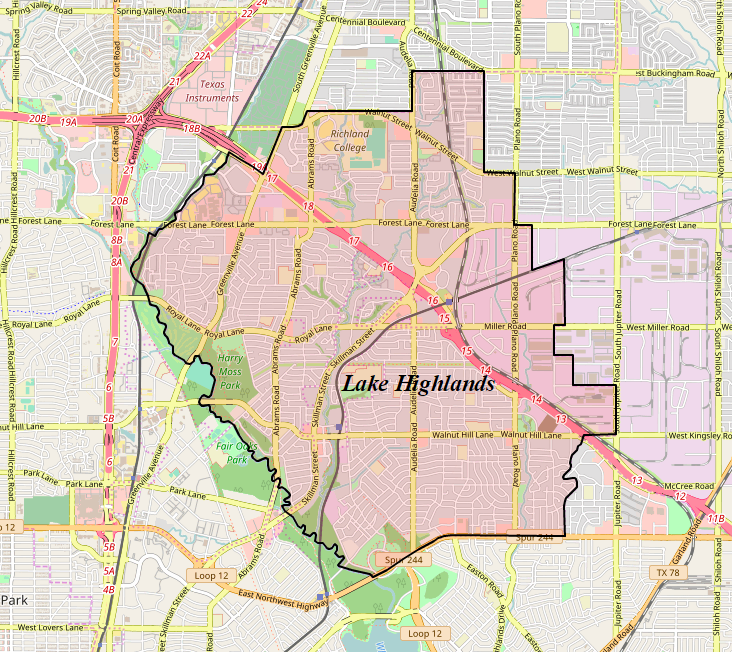
- Location within Lake Highlands in North Dallas
- Coordinates: 32.882880°N 96.743410°W
- Country: United States
- State: Texas
- Counties: Dallas
- City: Dallas
- Area: Lake Highlands
- Elevation: 515 ft (157 m)
- ZIP code: 75231
- Area codes: 214, 469, 972

Alexander's village is a non-HOA neighborhood in the Lake Highlands area of Dallas, Texas (USA). The neighborhood is triangular in shape and is bounded by Abrams Road, Fair Oaks Avenue, and White Rock Creek. Walnut Hill Lane runs directly through the neighborhood.

== About ==
Alexander's Village is about 4 miles (6.43 km) from White Rock Lake, which is accessible via Fair Oaks Park bike trail along White Rock Creek that directly connects the neighborhood, the lake, and other park facilities along White Rock Creek.

== Education ==
Students from this neighborhood would expect to attend Merriman Park Elementary School, Forest Meadow Junior High School and Lake Highlands High School in the Richardson Independent School District.
