= L Street =

L Street or "L" Street is the twelfth of a sequence of alphabetical streets in many cities (or eleventh, if "I" or "J" is omitted).

It may refer to:

- L Street (Washington, D.C.)
- L Street (Barstow, California)
- L Streets, Dallas, a neighborhood in Dallas, Texas

== See also ==
- L Street Bridge, bridge over Rock Creek in Washington, D.C.
- L Street Brownies, polar bear club in Boston, Massachusetts
- Carson Beach, South Boston, also known as L Street Beach
