= Whispering Hills =

Whispering Hills may refer to:

== Canada ==
- Whispering Hills, Alberta, a summer village

== United States ==
- Whispering Hills, Dallas, a neighborhood
