= Town Creek, Dallas =

Town Creek
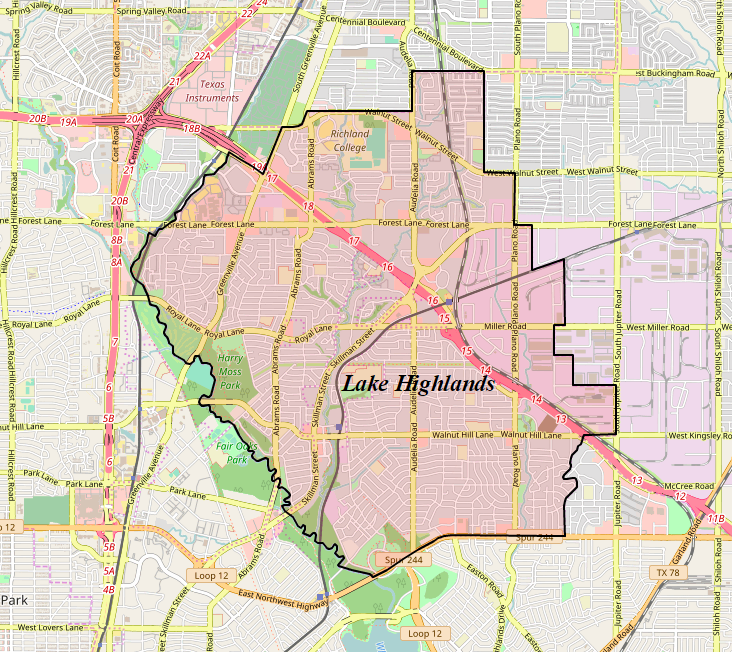
- Location within Lake Highlands in North Dallas
- Coordinates: 32.898463°N 96.733594°W
- Country: United States
- State: Texas
- Counties: Dallas
- City: Dallas
- Area: Lake Highlands
- Elevation: 556 ft (169 m)
- ZIP code: 75243
- Area codes: 214, 469, 972

Town Creek is a neighborhood in the Lake Highlands area of Dallas, Texas (USA). It is generally bounded by Royal Lane on the south; Abrams Road on the west; Briarhurst Drive, Whitehurst Drive, and Atherton Drive on the north; and Jackson Branch and Ferris Creek (tributaries of White Rock Creek) on the east. However, the Town Creek neighborhood proper excludes the Town Creek Shopping Center and the apartments located within those boundaries.

The neighborhood is a predominantly middle class and upper class area. A creek trail which runs through the neighborhood along a small tributary of Jackson Branch is popular for walkers, photographers, and nature-watchers. Wildlife is abundant in the neighborhood.

== Education ==
Town Creek is located within the Richardson Independent School District. Public school students living in the neighborhood are zoned to attend Skyview Elementary School, Forest Meadow Junior High, and Lake Highlands High School.
