= Apollo Junior High School =

Apollo Junior High

Location
- 1600 Apollo Road; Richardson, (Dallas County), Texas 75081; United States; 32.951892°N 96.694654°W

Information
- School type: Public school (government funded), Junior High School
- Status: Open
- School district: Richardson Independent School District
- NCES District ID: 4837020
- NCES School ID: 483702004122
- Administrator: An Tran
- Principal: Yolanda Gaither
- Faculty: 52.94(on full-time equivalent (FTE) basis)
- Teaching staff: 48.93 (FTE)
- Grades: 7-8
- Age range: 12-14
- Enrollment: 650 (2017-18)
- Student to teacher ratio: 13.28
- Campus type: City: Midsize
- Mascot: Panther
- Team name: Panthers
- Feeder to: Lloyd V. Berkner High School
- Website: schools.risd.org/ApolloJHS/

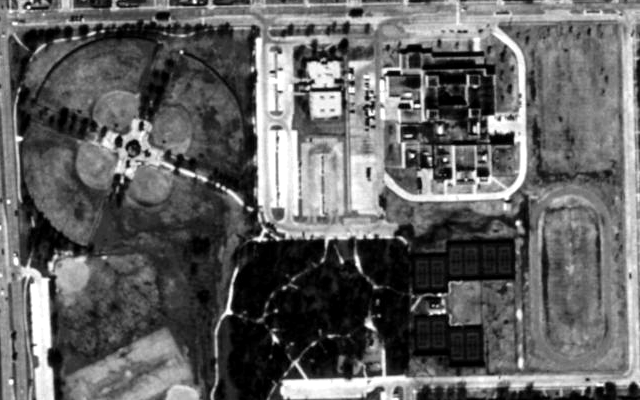
Apollo Junior High School aerial photograph.

Apollo Junior High School is a secondary school in Richardson, Texas. It is part of the Richardson Independent School District.

Apollo is one of two intermediate schools that feed L.V. Berkner High School. Founded in 1977, Apollo educates students in grades 7–8.

Its approximate annual enrollment is 800 students, nearly twice that of the Texas state average for middle schools. The student-teacher ratio is 16.5:1.

== Accomplishments ==
The Apollo Junior High Band is the one out of two bands in the history of Texas to win the Texas Music Educators Association Honor Band Competition for three consecutive years of eligibility.

In 1998 and 2000, teachers at the school were the recipients of the Edyth May Sliffe Award for excellence in mathematics.

== Fine Arts Departments ==
=== Band ===
The Apollo Junior High band is a combination of brass instruments, woodwind instruments, and percussion. Student have a chance to join the band program in 6th grade, but if they miss that opportunity they are not allowed to join in the future. Because of how many students chose to do band, and continue on to Apollo, and the high school L. V. Berkner High School the band program at Apollo is split into three bands, with an extra band reserved for people that are either not good enough to make any of the bands or have behavioral issues (This band usually only contains 4-7 people at a time). There is also a percussion only band. Percussion is also technically part of the other bands but percussion players get taught by the high school percussion director. The order of the bands is this:

- Apollo Symphonic 1 (Varsity Band)
- Apollo Symphonic 2 (Sub-Varsity Band)
- Apollo Symphonic 3 (Non-Sub-Varsity Band, also called by students and staff "Concert Band)"
- Apollo Symphonic 4 (Remedial Band, referred to by students and staff as "Intermediate Band")
- Percussion Class (Percussion only band, Taught by Brice Freeman)

Apollo Symphonic 4 is the only band that does not attend the yearly UIL competition, which is the standard end of year competition for most Texas secondary school bands. The band directors and their corresponding bands are:

- David Becker (Head of Band and Director of the Varsity Band)
- Sarah Minogue (Director of Non-Sub-Varsity & Remedial Band)
- Brice Freeman (Director of Percussion)

=== Orchestra ===
The Orchestra is composed of string instruments. It is a separate class from band but follows much of the same conventions. Students must join in the 6th grade or they will not be allowed to join in the future. The orchestra has less students than the band so it is only split into two orchestras. This is the order of the orchestras:

- Symphony Orchestra (Varsity Orchestra)
- Philharmonic Orchestra (Sub-Varsity Orchestra)

Both orchestras attend their yearly UIL competition. The Orchestra directors and their corresponding orchestras are:

- Carina Parker (Head of Orchestra & Director of Varsity Orchestra)
- Marie Smith Garcia (Director of Sub-Varsity Orchestra)

=== Choir ===
Choir can be joined at any time during a students time at Apollo and is led by only one teacher, Ms. Sierra Johnson. It is separated into three choirs. This is the order of choirs:

- Concert Choir (Varsity Female Choir)
- Treble Choir (Sub-Varsity Female Choir)
- Tenor/Bass Choir (Varsity Male Choir)

=== Theater ===
The Apollo Theater Department is led by Ms. Sara Muir. It is organized into 4 classes in total: three classes being the non-competition theater troupe and one class being the competition theater troupe. Here is it visualized as a list like the rest of the fine arts sections:

- Advanced Theater (Competition Troupe)
- Intro Theater (Non-Competition Troupe)

Students must complete one year of Intro Theater to progress to Advanced Theater unless they get invited to Advanced Theater by the theater director.

=== Requirements ===
Most students at Apollo are required to take one year of a fine arts course to progress to High School.

== Notable alumni ==
- Jensen Ackles, television actor and fashion model (1993)
