= Northwood Heights, Dallas =

Northwood Heights
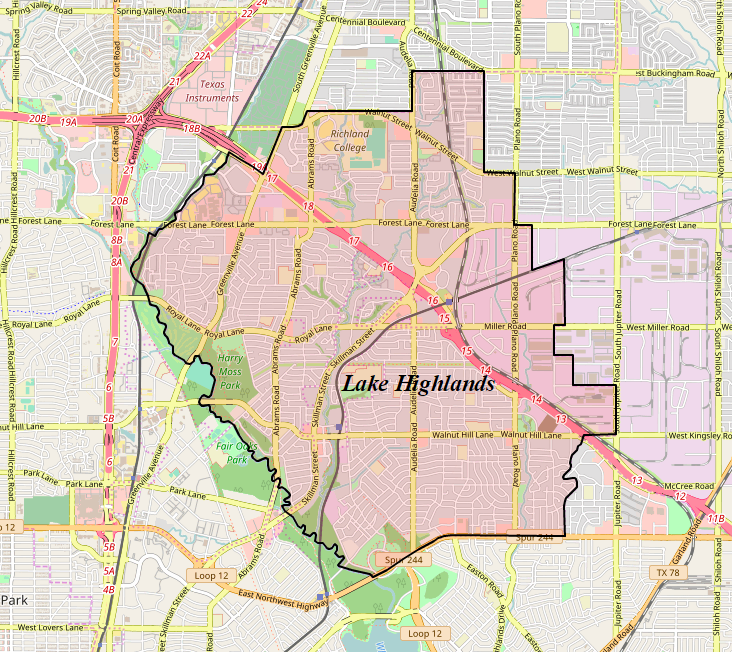
- Location within Lake Highlands in North Dallas
- Coordinates: 32.908284°N 96.752599°W
- Country: United States
- State: Texas
- Counties: Dallas
- City: Dallas
- Area: Lake Highlands
- Elevation: 577 ft (176 m)
- ZIP code: 75243
- Area codes: 214, 469, 972

Northwood Heights is a neighborhood in the Lake Highlands area of Dallas, Texas (USA). It is generally bounded by Forest Lane on the North, Landa Lane on the West, Skyline Drive on the South, and Shepherd Lane on the East. The neighborhood includes individual residences, apartments, and multiple function dwellings.
