= Hamilton Park, Dallas =

Neighborhood in Dallas, Texas, United States

Hamilton Park is a neighborhood in north Dallas, Texas (USA), named for Dr. Richard T. Hamilton, a physician and black civic leader. It is located in Northwest Lake Highlands, on the southeastern side of the North Central Expressway (US 75)/I-635 interchange (High Five), north of Forest Lane, and west of DART's Red Line light-rail line. The neighborhood had a population of 2,148 in 1990.

== History ==
Hamilton Park's founding can be traced to two instances — in 1950, several black homes in south Dallas were bombed, and in 1953, a Dallas bond election okayed the demolition of housing in black neighborhoods so that Love Field airport could expand. This created a desperate need for black housing in the city, so home builders worked with the Dallas Negro Chamber of Commerce (today the Dallas Black Chamber of Commerce) to stir up activism to get developments built.

The largest proposal was a 3,000 acres (12 km^{2}) community along the Trinity River, 5.5 miles (8.9 km) northwest of downtown that blacks ultimately rejected due to its proximity to the "riverbottom." In May 1949, Karl Hoblitzelle encouraged trustees of his charitable foundation to contribute to the cause. In 1953, the group donated US$216,872.93 to the Dallas Citizens' Interracial Association to purchase a 233 acres (0.94 km^{2}) site for Hamilton Park. In addition, the group borrowed $423,619.99 from three Dallas banks to finance infrastructure.

The neighborhood was dedicated in October 1953, opened in May 1954, and was complete by 1961. It contained a shopping center, a park, a twelve-grade school (later made six-grade), 742 single-family homes and an apartment complex. The school built in the neighborhood (now known as Hamilton Park Pacesetter Magnet) was originally segregated, but this ended in 1975 when the school started the Pacesetter program and parents of non-black children sent their kids to the school.

Hamilton Park's prime location is at the SE portion of what is now the High Five Interchange or the intersection of North Central Expressway (US 75) and I-635 attracted interested in 1985 — that year, a developer proposed to purchase part or all of Hamilton Park for high-rise buildings but residents opposed the proposal and it fell through.
