= Detron Smith =

American football player (born 1974)

No. 42, 39, 33
- Position: Fullback

Personal information
- Born: February 25, 1974 (age 52); Dallas, Texas, U.S.
- Listed height: 5 ft 10 in (1.78 m)
- Listed weight: 229 lb (104 kg)

Career information
- High school: Lake Highlands (Dallas)
- College: Texas A&M
- NFL draft: 1996: 3rd round, 65th overall pick

Career history
- Denver Broncos (1996–2001); Jacksonville Jaguars (2002)*; Indianapolis Colts (2002–2003)
- * Offseason or practice squad member only

Awards and highlights
- 2× Super Bowl champion (XXXII, XXXIII); Pro Bowl (1999)

Career NFL statistics
- Rushing yards: 17
- Rushing average: 3.4
- Receptions: 13
- Receiving yards: 103
- Total touchdowns: 2
- Stats at Pro Football Reference

Detron Nigel Smith (born February 25, 1974) is an American former professional football player who was a fullback in the National Football League (NFL), primarily with the Denver Broncos. He played college football for the Texas A&M Aggies and was selected by the Broncos in the third round of the 1996 NFL draft. He was selected to the Pro Bowl in 1999 as a special teamer.

== Early life and college ==
Smith was a consensus Texas Top 100 selection at Lake Highlands High School in Dallas, Texas and was rated the second-best fullback prospect in the Southwest, receiving a perfect score of 10 points on Max Emfinger's Blue Chip List. During his career at Lake Highlands, he carried the ball 181 times for 1,351 yards (7.5 yards per carry) and scored 15 touchdowns.

Smith was primarily a blocking back during his career at Texas A&M, creating holes for future NFL running backs Rodney Thomas, Greg Hill, and Leeland McElroy. He rushed 57 times for 184 yards (3.2 yards per carry) and one touchdown, while catching 33 passes for 300 yards (9.1 yards per catch) with a long of 35 yards. Smith also returned five kickoffs for 54 yards. During his first two years at A&M (1992–93), Smith's running backs coach was his future Broncos offensive coordinator and current Denver Broncos head coach Gary Kubiak. Smith made a key block on a McElroy touchdown in the 1993 game against Texas that secured the Southwest Conference title for the Aggies.

== Professional career ==
Smith was the first blocking fullback selected when he was drafted in the third round (65th overall) of the 1996 NFL draft by the Denver Broncos, and the second true fullback behind only Tampa Bay's Mike Alstott. In April 2002, after six seasons in Denver, Smith was signed by the Jacksonville Jaguars. However, he was released before making an appearance and played for the Indianapolis Colts in 2002 and 2003. He was released by the Colts in early 2004.

During his tenure in the NFL, Smith was known as an energetic player who is competitive in blocking and special teams alike. With both the Broncos and Indianapolis Colts, Smith became a fan favorite with his hits on special teams and willingness to do the little things. In total, he played in 113 games over 8 seasons, highlighted by his selection to the Pro Bowl 1999 and two Super Bowl rings won with the Broncos (Super Bowl XXXII in 1997 and Super Bowl XXXIII in 1998).
