= L Streets, Dallas =

L Streets
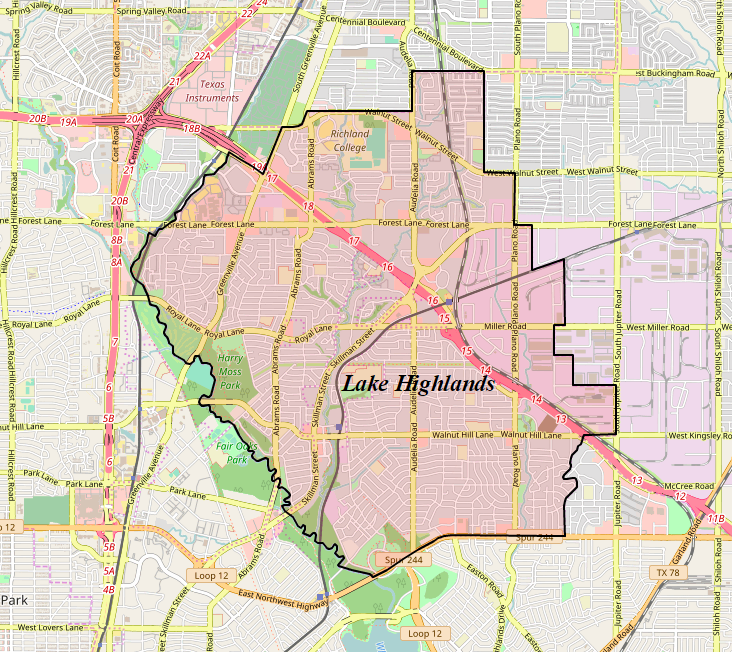
- Location within Lake Highlands in North Dallas
- Coordinates: 32.871644°N 96.704883°W
- Country: United States
- State: Texas
- Counties: Dallas
- City: Dallas
- Area: Lake Highlands
- ZIP code: 75238
- Area codes: 214, 469, 972

The L Streets is a neighborhood in the Lake Highlands area of Dallas, Texas (USA). It is generally bounded by Ferndale Road on the west, Northwest Highway (Loop 12) on the south, Plano Road on the east and Kingsley/Walnut Hill on the north. However, it excludes commercial property on its southwest and southeast corners, apartments along Northwest Highway and a church on its northeast corner.

== History ==
The neighborhood was developed in 1954. The area is known as the "L Streets" because all but two streets in the neighborhood (McCree and San Souci) begin with the letter L. Greenland Hills, better known as the "M Streets", follows the same principle.

== Recreation ==
McCree Park is located directly to the east of the neighborhood.
