= Rich Phillips =

Rich Phillips is an American radio personality based out of Dallas, Texas. He currently serves as a sports reporter for the popular "Dunham & Miller" radio show, heard weekday mornings from 5:30-10 on KTCK 1310 AM.

Phillips is the primary reporter for NASCAR-related material at KTCK. In 2001, he was named play by play commentator for the SMU Mustangs football radio broadcasts.
