= Platinum Corridor, Dallas =

Platinum Corridor
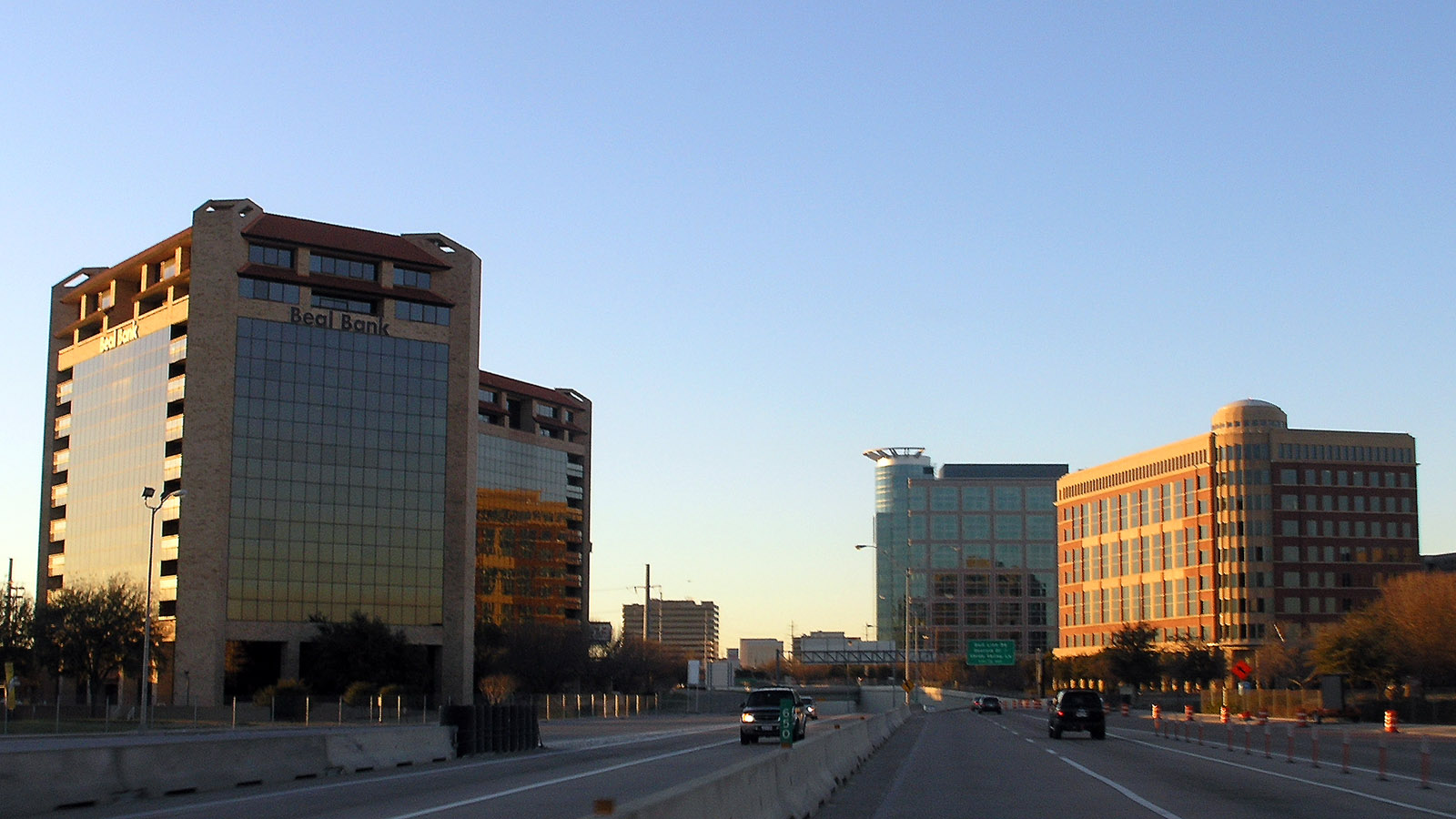
- Buildings in north Dallas (left, east) and Addison (right, west) at the Dallas North Tollway and Arapaho Road
- Country: United States
- State: Texas
- Counties: Dallas
- City: Dallas, Addison, Farmers Branch, Plano, Frisco
- Elevation: 659 ft (201 m)
- ZIP code: 75230, 75240, 75244,75252, 75254, 75001, 75248, 75287, 75093, 75024, 75034
- Area codes: 214, 469, 972

The Platinum Corridor is a neighborhood and office submarket in the Dallas, Texas (USA) area. Beginning just north of Interstate 635 in north Dallas, the corridor hugs the Dallas North Tollway for 13.7 miles (22.0 km) north to State Highway 121 in Frisco. It runs through the cities of Dallas, Farmers Branch, Addison, Plano, and Frisco.

== Attractions ==
- Galleria Dallas in north Dallas
- Addison Circle in Addison
- The Shops at Willow Bend in Plano
- Legacy West in Plano
- The Shops at Legacy in Plano
- Legacy Town Center in Plano
- Stonebriar Centre in Frisco
- Dr Pepper Ballpark in Frisco
- Toyota Stadium in Frisco
