= Preston Center, Dallas =

Coordinates: 32.865°N 96.804°W

Preston Center
- Interactive map of Preston Center
- Country: United States
- State: Texas
- Counties: Dallas
- City: Dallas
- Area: North Dallas

Area
  - Total: 0.161 sq mi (0.417 km^{2})
  - Land: 0.161 sq mi (0.417 km^{2})
  - Water: 0 sq mi (0.0 km^{2}) 0.0%
- Elevation: 564 ft (172 m)
- ZIP codes: 75225
- Area codes: 214, 469, 972

Preston Center is a commercial district in north Dallas, Texas (USA), located around the intersection of Preston Road (State Highway 289) and Northwest Highway (Loop 12). It covers 103 acres (42 ha).

Preston Center initially opened as a thriving suburban retail center anchored by the first suburban Neiman Marcus (closed in 1965) and Sanger Brothers (later Sanger-Harris) department store - which was the largest suburban department store in the country at 242,000 square feet (22,000 m^{2}). The area has been a premier retail center in Dallas since its development in the 1950s, though the nearby NorthPark Center has provided significant competition.

It evolved into a successful office sub-market in the region with over 3,000,000 square feet (279,000 m^{2}) of office space and housing former president George W Bush's office, as well as some residential neighborhoods in Dallas. University Park is to the south, a string of condos along Northwest Highway is to the east, and the Preston Hollow neighborhood is to the north. Preston Center has over 500,000 square feet (46,000 m^{2}) of retail space, a hotel, and residential units. It is an example of an edge city.

The development includes two 20-story office towers that opened during a construction boom of the late 1970s and early 1980s. As of 1989 many of the Preston Center buildings were partially vacant. During that year Terry Box of The Dallas Morning News said that the vacant buildings were perceived by residents of nearby Preston Hollow as "intrusive symbols of the city's failure to control its growth" and "have come to exemplify much of what is wrong with North Dallas." Around that time residents tried to pressure area politicians into making the development more low-rise and further removed from the Preston Hollow community.

As of 2019 the families of many property owners had already owned the properties for some time.

A municipal-owned parking garage serves Preston Center developments as the city is obligated to provide parking.

As of 2019 several owners of Preston Center developments oppose redevelopment as it would interrupt their cash flow in the short term. Even though the redevelopment of the municipal-owned parking garage is now stalemate, Preston Center has continued to densify and grow as new development projects have been constructed in this very sought after area.
