= Telecom Corridor =

Business center in Richardson, Texas

Coordinates: 32.96°N 96.73°W

The Telecom Corridor is a technology business center in Richardson, Texas, a northern suburb of Dallas, which contains over 25 million square feet (2.3 square kilometers) of office space and accounts for over 130,000 jobs. Located in the Dallas/Fort Worth area and home to the University of Texas at Dallas, the Corridor is a strip about 6.5 miles (10.5 km) long along U.S. Route 75 (US 75) (the North Central Expressway), between President George Bush Turnpike and Interstate 635 (I-635) and is often considered an area of the Silicon Prairie. More than 5,700 companies, including 600 technology companies are headquartered in the area, including significant players such as AT&T, Alcatel-Lucent, Ericsson, Verizon, Samsung, Fujitsu, Texas Instruments, and MetroPCS (now part of T-Mobile). Some of these companies also have offices in Telecom Valley located in California. Although the Telecom Corridor was a booming area of Dallas's economy during the late 1990s, the dot-com bust of 2000 hit the region hard. However, it began recovering in 2004 and the recovery has since picked up momentum, gaining both the operations of many non-technology-related companies and many previously non-existent residential units designed in the New Urbanist style. The name "Telecom Corridor" is a registered trademark and may technically only be used to describe the area mentioned in this article.

== Telecom Corridor Genealogy Project ==
The Telecom Corridor Genealogy Project is a project to enable professionals in the Telcom Corridor to find out about their common history and thereby to enable them to network more easily.

== Transportation ==
=== Major highways ===
- I-635
- US 75 (North Central Expressway)
- President George Bush Turnpike (toll) (frontage roads: SH 190)

=== Light rail ===
- DART: Red Line
  - Spring Valley (DART station)
  - Arapaho Center (DART station)
  - Galatyn Park (DART station)
  - Bush Turnpike (DART station)
