= Lake Highlands High School =

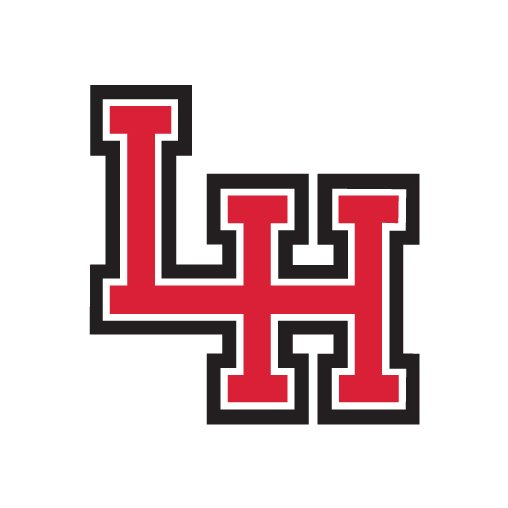
- 9449 Church Road; Dallas, Texas 75238; United States

Information
- Type: Public, secondary
- Established: 1960
- School district: Richardson Independent School District
- Teaching staff: 209.32 (FTE)
- Grades: 9–12
- Enrollment: 2,925 (2023–2024)
- Student to teacher ratio: 13.97
- Colors: Red, white, and black
- Nickname: Wildcats
- Rival: Richardson High School, Lloyd V. Berkner High School, J.J. Pearce High School, Plano Senior High School, Jesuit College Preparatory School of Dallas
- Website: Official school website

Lake Highlands High School (LHHS) is a secondary school serving grades 9–12 in the Lake Highlands area of northeastern Dallas, Texas, United States, primarily serving the Lake Highlands community. The school is part of the Richardson Independent School District and is in central Lake Highlands near the DART Blue Line. The Lake Highlands Freshman Center (which sits on the same property as LHHS) formerly housed the 9th-grade students, but has recently been integrated into the rest of the school, housing classes for all 9–12 students. The first graduating class of Lake Highlands High School was in 1964.

== History ==
The first two schools in the Lake Highlands community were Lake Highlands Elementary School, which hosted grades 1–4, and Wallace Elementary, which housed grades 5–8, as the original high school building was under construction in 1959. Officially, Lake Highlands High School was established in 1960 at what is now Lake Highlands Jr. High School at the corner of Ferndale and Walnut Hill. The current campus on Church Road was opened (albeit under construction) in 1964, with the class of 1970 being the first to graduate from the new campus. The 1978 made-for-television film Cotton Candy was shot at the high school. The film was both directed and produced by Ron Howard.

On May 16, 1983, Lake Highlands High School was the site of a fatal armed robbery when Billy Conn Gardner (1943–1995) entered the school's office, shot and fatally wounded 64-year-old cafeteria supervisor Thelma Row, and stole $1,600 in cash. Gardner was sentenced to death for the crime and was executed by lethal injection in 1995.

On May 30, 2021, valedictorian Paxton Smith replaced her approved speech to the graduating class to attack the limitations on abortion in Texas Senate Bill 8 of the 87th legislature, a heartbeat bill signed by the governor earlier that month.

== Academics ==
In 2002, the school received a Blue Ribbon award from the U.S. Department of Education.

== Extracurricular activities ==
=== Athletics ===
The school mascot is the Wildcat. This is also the mascot of several of the high school's feeder schools including Lake Highlands Elementary, Northlake Elementary, and Lake Highlands Junior High School.

The school won its first state title in 1964 in Class 2A Cross Country, and repeated in 1965 and 1966 in Class 3A.

The school's football team won the class 5A state championship in 1981.

The school has also won the 1968 and 2023 State Championships in Class 3A and 6A, respectively.

Boys golf won the Class 5A Team State Championship in 1988.

The powerlifting team won Texas High School Powerlifting Association State Championships in 1982, 1983 and 1987. The school won National High School Powerlifting Championships in 1983 and 1986.

Students at Lake Highlands play in the Texas High School Lacrosse League under the banner of The Black Cats, which is composed of players from LHHS as well as Hillcrest High School (Dallas), Bryan Adams High School and Woodrow Wilson High School (Dallas) and play their home games at Franklin Field.

As the second high school in the Richardson Independent School District, the Wildcats maintained a long standing rivalry with the Richardson High School Eagles. The two teams shared the old Greenville Avenue Stadium, which was located by the now RISD Administration Building, before both schools opened stadiums on their respective campuses. With the opening of L.V. Berkner High School and the eventual sharing of Wildcat-Ram Stadium, that rivalry naturally occurred. Recently, a rivalry with the J.J. Pearce High School Mustangs has grown. Outside of the RISD, the Wildcats and Plano Senior High School have played each other since the 1960s, while a recent rivalry had blossomed with Jesuit College Preparatory School of Dallas due to both proximity and the fact that the private school pulls a large number of its students from north Dallas, often from the RISD areas.

Opened in 1969 as "Lake Highlands Stadium", RISD's Wildcat-Ram Stadium is located on the western border of the campus. The stadium is shared with L.V. Berkner High School as the Berkner campus is home to a natatorium but not a full size stadium. The facility seats approximately 9,000 and was upgraded to field turf in 2000. The 2006 bond issue included funds to renovate the original pressbox and a new videoboard in the north endzone replaced the original scoreboard in the south endzone. Prior to the installation of the artificial playing surface, Wildcat-Ram had served as the showcase facility for the Dallas Cup youth soccer tournament due to the fact that it was the only facility of its size with natural grass inside Interstate 635. It was re-named for the mascots of both schools after the opening of Berkner's permanent campus in 1970-71.teams. Lake Highlands and Berkner have long been rivals in football and other sports.. Wildcat-Ram Stadium earned the nickname "The Boneyard" from LHHS students and fans and local sports media in reference to the team's use of the wishbone formation rushing attach. It also utilized as the home field for both of Lake Highlands High School's feeder junior highs, Lake Highlands Junior High School and Forest Meadow Junior High School, which end their football regular seasons with the annual "Battle for the Boneyard" trophy.

The Multi-Purpose Activity Center ("MAC") was completed in 2021 as part of the renovation of the entire campus. The 78,000 square foot facility includes an 80 yard indoor practice field and 24,000 square feet for offices, locker rooms, weight room and sport support areas.

=== Band ===
The school is the home of the "Wildcat Band", which consists of the Wildcat Marching Band, Jazz Band, several Concert Bands (including Concert, Symphonic, and Wind Ensemble), Winterguard, Percussion Program, Symphony Orchestra, and puts on a yearly Musical. The Symphonic Band made its first trip to the Midwest Band and Orchestra Clinic in December 1971. Later that school year, the band was selected as the Texas Music Educators Association (TMEA) Honor Band and performed at the TMEA convention in February 1973.

=== Dance team ===
The school is home of the "Wildcat Wranglers", one of the few high school Country/Western dance teams existing in the United States.

The school is also the home of the "Highlandettes", a Texas-style dance squad. They have performed in the Macy's Thanksgiving Day Parade numerous times, as well as at many Dallas Cowboys, Dallas Stars, and Dallas Mavericks games. They have also danced in Dublin, Ireland for the St. Patrick's Day parade; in Pearl Harbor, Honolulu, Hawaii, London, England; and Italy.

== Notable alumni ==
- Amy Acker - actress, Angel
- Erin Aldrich - track and field athlete, high jumper in 2000 Summer Olympics
- Nicole Bilderback - actress
- Paul Broome - Major League Soccer player
- Josh Carter - basketball guard; Texas A&M University, Maccabi Ashdod B.C.
- Warren Carter - University of Illinois basketball forward
- Marcus Coleman - former NFL safety for New York Jets, Houston Texans, and Dallas Cowboys
- John A. Davis - film director, writer, animator, voice actor and composer
- Phil Dawson - NFL kicker; Arizona Cardinals, Cleveland Browns
- Matt Dunigan - CFL Hall of Famer
- Morgan Fairchild - Emmy and Golden Globe Award-nominated actress
- George Gimarc - local radio personality
- Merton Hanks - former NFL safety for San Francisco 49ers and Seattle Seahawks
- Chris Harrison - host of TV show The Bachelor
- Gibby Haynes - musician, lead singer for rock band Butthole Surfers
- C.B. Hudson - lead guitarist of rock band Blue October
- Atatiana Jefferson
- Tre Johnson - NBA player with the Washington Wizards
- Justin Leonard - professional golfer, 1997 British Open champion
- Scott Livingstone - former MLB player
- Lusine - Electronic musician
- Sandra Lynch - first female judge of the United States Court of Appeals for the First Circuit
- Scoot McNairy - actor
- Anastasia Muñoz - voice actress affiliated with Funimation
- Marshall Newhouse - NFL lineman, Green Bay Packers
- Reggie Newhouse - NFL wide receiver, Arizona Cardinals
- Frank Okam - football defensive tackle for University of Texas and Houston Texans
- Darvis Patton - Olympic track athlete
- Kent Perkins - NFL offensive tackle for Cincinnati Bengals
- Rich Phillips - radio personality, SportsRadio 1310 The Ticket
- Alvin Rettig - Arena football running back/ linebacker for the Detroit Drive, member of Arena Football Hall of Fame
- James F. Reilly - NASA space shuttle astronaut, geologist
- St. Vincent - indie rock musician, real name Annie Clark
- Mark Salling - actor and singer on television show Glee
- Thomas Sleeper - classical composer
- Detron Smith - NFL running back (1996–2003) with Denver Broncos and Indianapolis Colts
- Granger Smith - country singer
- Wade Smith - Memphis University and NFL offensive tackle
- Matt Stover - NFL kicker with New York Giants, Cleveland Browns, Baltimore Ravens, and Indianapolis Colts
- Jordan Tata - former MLB player
- Nick Thurman - NFL defensive end with New England Patriots
- Andre Tillman - Miami Dolphins tight end (1975–1978)
- Don Welchel - former MLB pitcher with the Baltimore Orioles
- Kim Wozencraft - author
- Owen Temple - singer/songwriter
