= Richardson Independent School District =

School district in Richardson, Texas

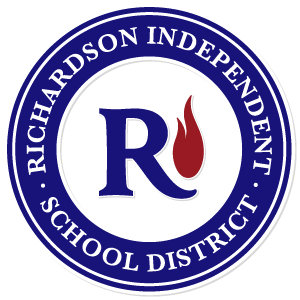

Address
- 400 S. Greenville Ave. Richardson, TX 75081 ESC Region 10 USA

District information
- Type: Public
- Motto: Where all students connect, learn, grow and succeed
- Grades: Pre-Kindergarten through 12th grade
- Superintendent: Tabitha Branum

Students and staff
- Athletic conference: UIL 6A

Other information
- Website: risd.org

Richardson Independent School District (RISD or Richardson ISD) is an independent school district in northern Dallas County, Texas, based in Richardson. The 46-square-mile (120 km^{2}) district serves the Dallas County portions of Richardson; (Note: Portions of Richardson in Collin County are served by Plano Independent School District) the Lake Highlands, Northwood Hills, and Prestonwood neighborhoods of Dallas; and small portions of Garland.

RISD operates 55 campuses and serves more than 37,000 students. In 2022, the district was given a "B" accountability rating by the Texas Education Agency.

== History ==
The district was founded in 1854. At the time it provided education for children of local farmers, small business owners and settlers around the railroad just outside Dallas, TX. In recent times RISD has been rated as "Recognized" by the Texas Education Agency for many years in a row. RISD is the largest, most racially and socioeconomically diverse district in Texas to receive a rating this high. In 2010 the Texas Business and Education Coalition (TBEC) added 22 RISD schools to the TBEC Honor Roll. RISD and Houston ISD leads the state in schools named to the Honor Roll. Only 252 public schools out of 8,000 in Texas were named to the TBEC Honor Roll, placing those 22 RISD schools in the top 4% of Texas public schools.

=== KRET-TV ===
KRET-TV
- Richardson, Texas; United States
- Channels: Analog: 23 (UHF)

Programming
- Affiliations: Educational Independent

Ownership
- Owner: Richardson Independent School District

History
- First air date: February 29, 1960
- Last air date: August 31, 1970; transitioned to closed circuit system
- Call sign meaning: "Richardson Educational Television"

Technical information
- ERP: 3.39 kW visual, .676 kW aural
- HAAT: 79 m (260 ft)

KRET-TV (channel 23) was a non-commercial educational television station which broadcast from 1960 to 1970. It was owned by the school district, and was the first broadcast TV station in the nation to be wholly owned by a school district. The call letters "RET" stood for "Richardson Educational Television".

KRET began broadcasting February 29, 1960, with a broadcast range of about 20 miles (32 km); it broadcast only on weekdays eventually matching school hours, and not during the summer. It was actually the first educational television station in the Dallas–Fort Worth area, signing on about six months before KERA-TV. The studio was first located at Richardson Junior High School from 1960 to 1963, then at Richardson High School from 1963 to 1970. The station was converted on August 31, 1970, into a closed-circuit network named "TAGER". The tower stood on the campus of Richardson High School before being taken down in the mid-2000s, to make room for expansion of the school building. Channel 23 was later reallocated to nearby Garland. The frequency remained dark until 1985 when religious broadcaster KIAB-TV signed on the air. The station was later sold to Univision and became KUVN-TV, the network's O&O for North Texas.

The 1969–1970 Television Factbook/Stations volume listed the following station personnel for KRET-TV:

- Lloyd J. Collins – station manager
- Jay Garrett – audio tech
- Richard F. Hays – director of programming
- Bob Ramsey – chief engineer

== Demographics ==
As of the Richardson Independent School District 2020-21 school year, 95.7% of teachers are licensed, and 82.7% have three or more years of experience. The student-to-teacher ratio is lower than the state average, at 13:1. The district has 70 full-time counselors on staff. The student body at the schools served by Richardson Independent School District is 30% White, 22.4% Black, 6.9% Asian or Asian/Pacific Islander, 37.3% Hispanic/Latino, 0.3% American Indian or Alaska Native, and 0.1% Native Hawaiian or other Pacific Islander. In addition, 3% of students are two or more races, and 0% have not specified their race or ethnicity.

== Secondary schools ==
=== High schools ===
- Lloyd V. Berkner High School (Richardson) - 1988-89 National Blue Ribbon School
- Lake Highlands High School (Dallas) - 2001-02 National Blue Ribbon School
- J.J. Pearce High School (Richardson) - 1988-1989 National Blue Ribbon School
- Richardson High School (Richardson) - 1983-84 National Blue Ribbon School
- Christa McAuliffe Learning Center (Richardson)

=== Junior high schools ===
- Apollo Junior High School (Richardson)
- Liberty Junior High School (Dallas)
- Parkhill Junior High School (Dallas) - 1992-93 National Blue Ribbon School
- Richardson North Junior High School (Richardson)
- Richardson West Junior High School (Richardson)
- Westwood Junior High School (Dallas) - 2011 National Blue Ribbon School

=== Middle School ===
- Forest Meadow Middle- formerly Forest Meadow Junior High
- Lake Highlands Middle - formerly Lake Highlands Junior High

== Primary schools ==
- Aikin Elementary School (Dallas)
- Arapaho Classical Magnet School (Richardson)
- Audelia Creek Elementary School (Dallas)
- Big Springs Elementary School (Garland) - 1987-88 and 2008 National Blue Ribbon School
- Bowie Elementary School (Dallas) - 2000-2001 National Blue Ribbon School
- Brentfield Elementary School (Dallas) - 1993-94 National Blue Ribbon School
- Carolyn G. Bukhair Elementary School (Dallas)
- Canyon Creek Elementary School (Richardson) - 2005 National Blue Ribbon School
- Dartmouth Elementary School (Richardson) - 1989-90 National Blue Ribbon School
- Dover Elementary School (Richardson)
- Forest Lane Academy (Dallas)
- Forestridge Elementary School (Dallas)
- Hamilton Park Pacesetter Magnet (Dallas) - 1985-86 National Blue Ribbon School
- Jess Harben Elementary School (Richardson)
- Lake Highlands Elementary School (Dallas)
- Mark Twain Elementary School (Richardson)
- Math/Science/Technology Magnet School (Richardson)
- Merriman Park Elementary School (Dallas) - 1989-90 National Blue Ribbon School
- Mohawk Elementary School (Richardson) - 2005 National Blue Ribbon School
- Moss Haven Elementary School (Dallas) - 1993-94 National Blue Ribbon School
- Northlake Elementary School (Dallas)
- Northrich Elementary School
- Northwood Hills Elementary School (Dallas)
- O. Henry Elementary School (Garland)
- Prairie Creek Elementary School (Richardson) - 2003 National Blue Ribbon School
- Prestonwood Elementary School (Dallas) - 1996-97 National Blue Ribbon School
- Richardson Heights Elementary School (Richardson)
- Richardson Terrace Elementary School (Richardson)
- Richland Elementary School (Richardson)
- RISD Academy (Dallas)
- Skyview Elementary School (Dallas)
- Spring Creek Elementary School (Dallas)
- Stults Road Elementary School (Dallas)
- Wallace Elementary School (Dallas)
- White Rock Elementary School (Dallas)
- Yale Elementary School (Richardson) - 2006 National Blue Ribbon School

== Former schools ==
=== Former secondary schools ===
- Northwood Junior High School (closed 1988); now RISD Academy
- Richardson Junior High School (closed 2005); now Math/Science/Technology Magnet Elementary School

=== Former elementary schools ===
- Greenwood Hills Elementary School (Closed in 2024)
- Springridge Elementary School (Closed in 2024)
- Spring Valley Elementary School (Closed in 2024)
- Thurgood Marshall Elementary School (Closed in 2024)
- Arapaho elementary (closed in 2005; now houses Arapaho classical magnet)

== See also ==
- List of school districts in Texas
- KRET-TV (station owned by the Richardson ISD from 1960 to 1970)
- Diane Patrick, member of the Texas House of Representatives from Arlington and former teacher in Richardson independent School district

== Bibliography ==
- Shannon, Mike. DFW TV STATIONS. The History of Dallas-Fort Worth Radio and Television.
- Initial KRET broadcast date
