= North Dallas =

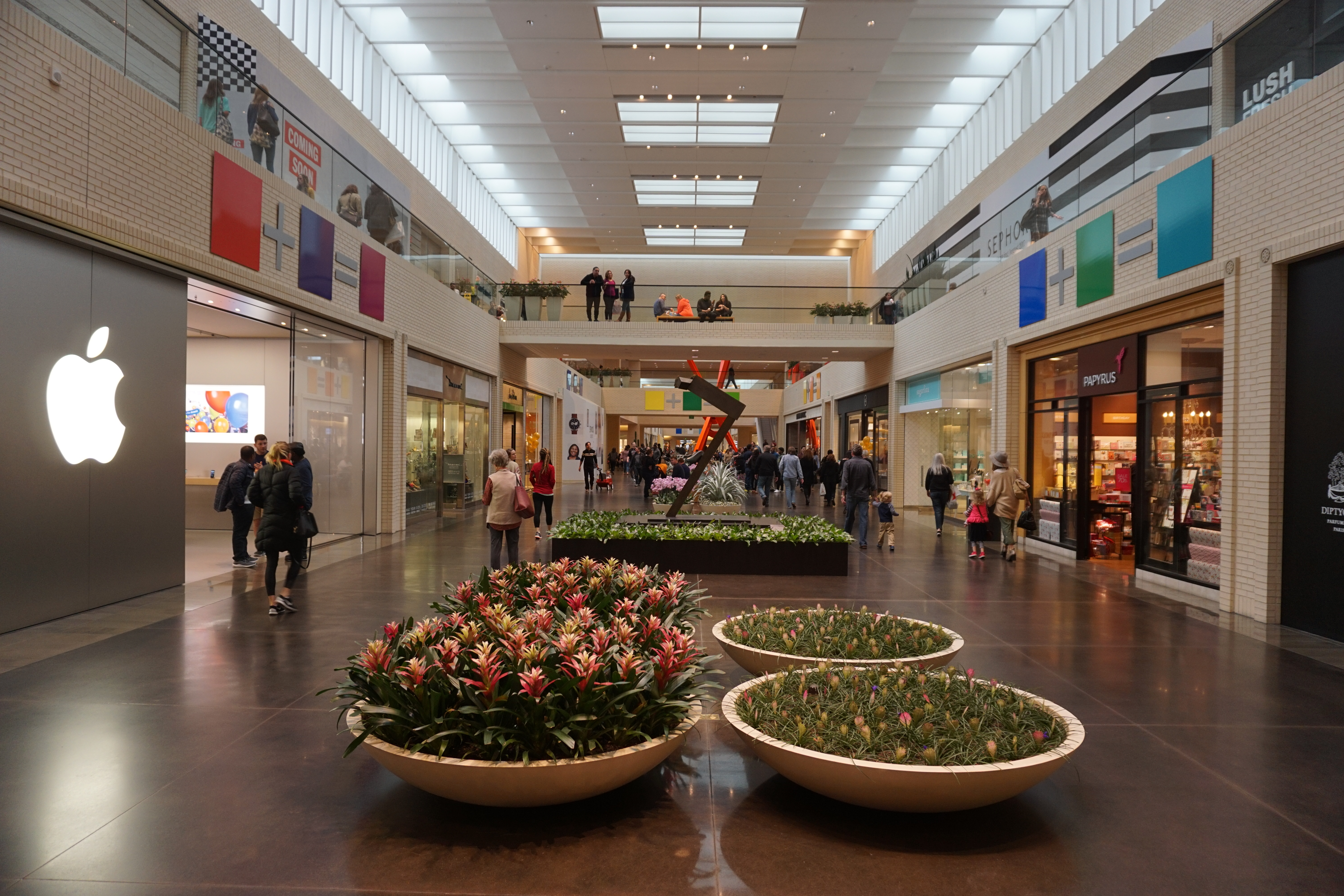
- North Park in North Dallas.

- Location in Dallas
- Country: United States
- State: Texas
- Counties: Collin, Dallas, Denton
- City: Dallas
- Elevation: 568 ft (173 m)
- ZIP codes: 75206, 75209, 75220, 75225, 75229, 75230, 75231, 75238, 75240, 75243, 75244, 75248, 75251, 75252, 75254, 75287
- Area codes: 214, 469, 972

North Dallas is an area of numerous communities and neighborhoods in Dallas, Texas (United States). The phrase "North Dallas" is also sometimes used to include any suburb or exurb north of Dallas proper within the metropolitan area. The majority of North Dallas is located in Dallas County, while a small portion is located in Collin and Denton counties.

North Dallas generally includes areas of Dallas north of Northwest Highway, along with Lake Highlands and areas of Dallas north of IH-635 known as Far North Dallas. The area has strong social and economic ties to the Dallas enclave of Park Cities, and two inner suburbs of Dallas, Richardson and Addison.

As Dallas has grown over the last several decades, the concept of "North Dallas" has changed from the area just north of downtown, along Central Expressway (where North Dallas High School is located), to the far northern reaches of Dallas proper and the suburbs to the north of the city.

== Education ==
=== Secondary ===
The Collin County portion of North Dallas is served by the Plano Independent School District.

Most of the Dallas County portion of North Dallas is served by the Dallas Independent School District, and students are zoned to either Emmett J. Conrad, Hillcrest, Thomas Jefferson, or W. T. White High Schools.

All of Lake Highlands and portions of Far North Dallas in the Dallas County are served by the Richardson Independent School District. Lake Highlands students are zoned to Lake Highlands High School (Dallas) or Lloyd V. Berkner High School (Richardson), while portions of Far North Dallas are zoned to J.J. Pearce High School (Richardson) or Richardson High School (Richardson).

The Denton County portion of North Dallas is served by the Carrollton-Farmers Branch Independent School District, and students are zoned to R.L. Turner High School or Newman Smith High School.

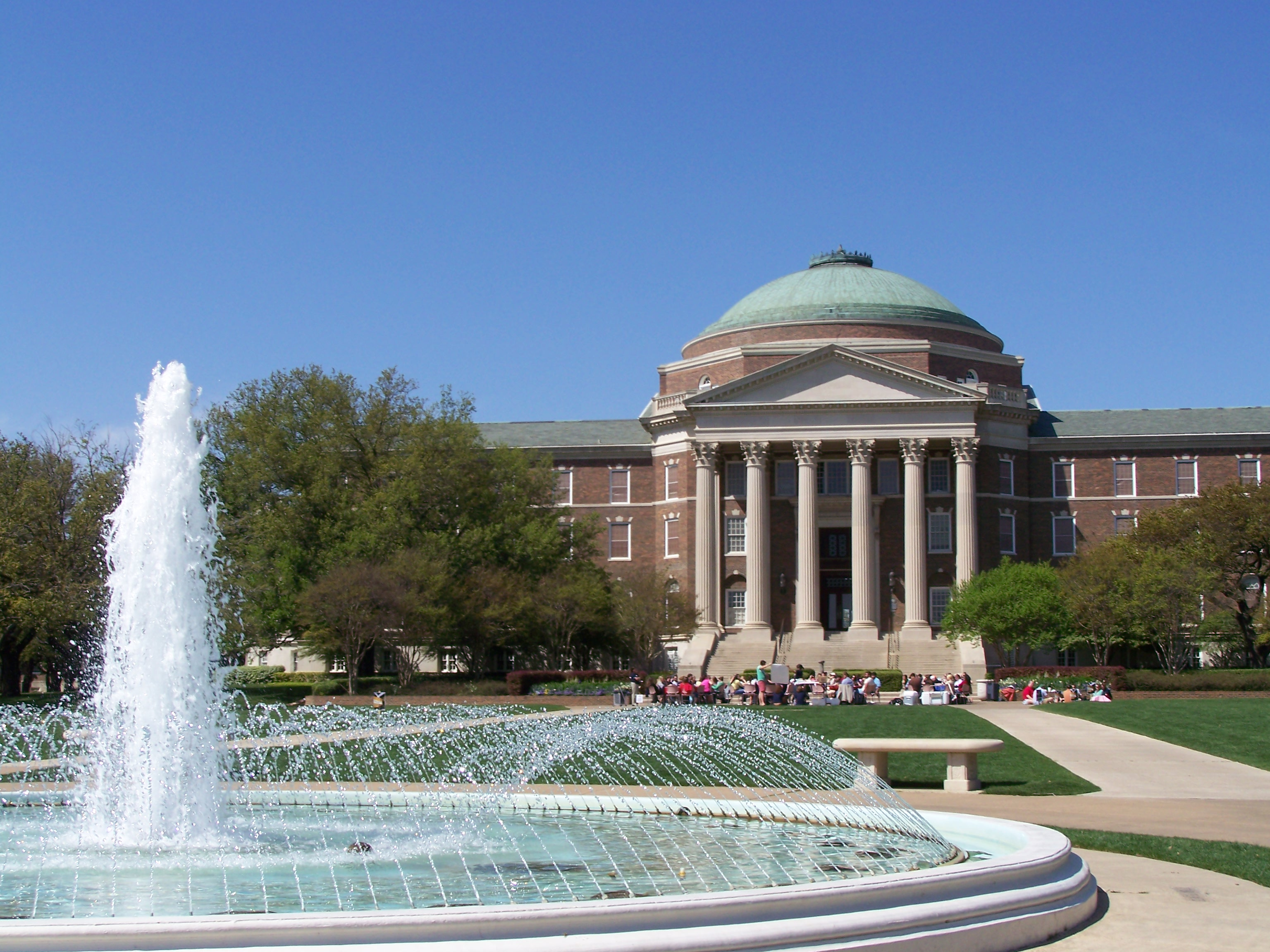
Dallas Hall at Dedman College at Southern Methodist University in University Park, Texas

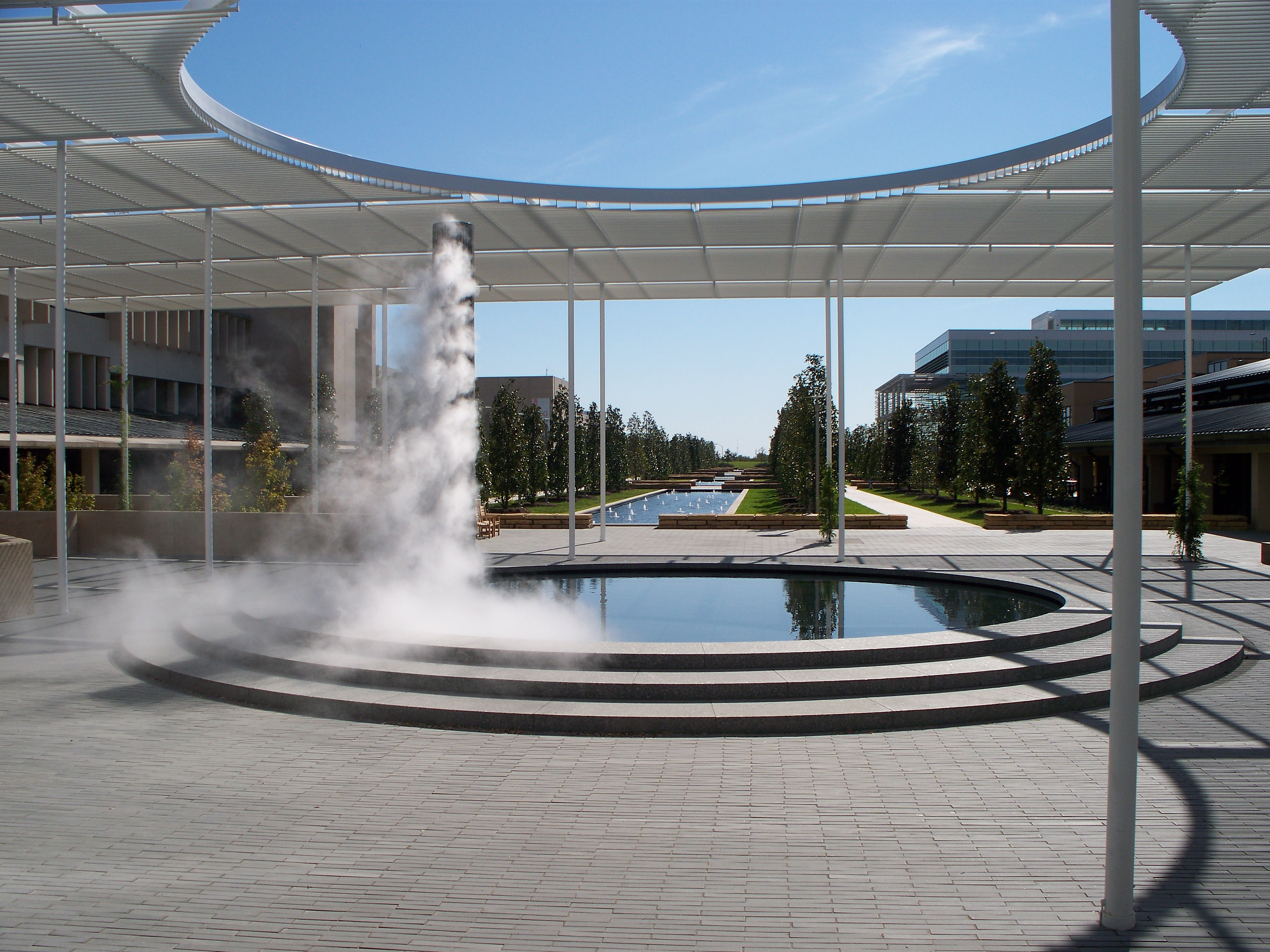
Campus Mall at The University of Texas at Dallas

=== Colleges and universities ===
- Southern Methodist University (SMU) is a private university in University Park. SMU was founded in 1911 by the Southern Methodist Church and now enrolls 6,500 undergraduates, 1,200 professional students in the law and theology departments, and 3,500 postgraduates. According to sources such as the U.S. News & World Report, SMU is the best overall undergraduate college in the Dallas-Fort Worth Metroplex and the third best in the State of Texas.
- The University of Texas at Dallas (UTD), part of the state public University of Texas System, is located in the city of Richardson, is adjacent to Far North Dallas, and is in the heart of the Telecom Corridor. UT Dallas, or UTD, is renowned for its work in combining the arts and technology, as well as for its programs in engineering, computer science, economics, international political economy, neuroscience, speech and hearing, pre-health, pre-law and management. The university has many collaborative research relationships with UT Southwestern Medical Center. UT Dallas is home to approximately 21,145 students.
- Richland College, part of the Dallas County Community College District, is located within Lake Highlands. The school was founded in 1972 and is the largest school in the DCCCD, featuring nearly 22,000 students. Richland is the only community college to receive the Malcolm Baldrige National Quality Award.
- Brookhaven College, part of the Dallas County Community College District, is located near Far North Dallas. Brookhaven opened in 1978, making it the newest college in DCCCD, featuring nearly 11,000 students
- Texas A&M's TAMU-Dallas campus (the Texas AgriLife Research and Extension Center at Dallas) is also located in the Far North Dallas. TAMU-Dallas is the home of the Urban Living Laboratory, which is a research and urban lifestyle community built with state-of-the-art green technologies.

== Libraries ==
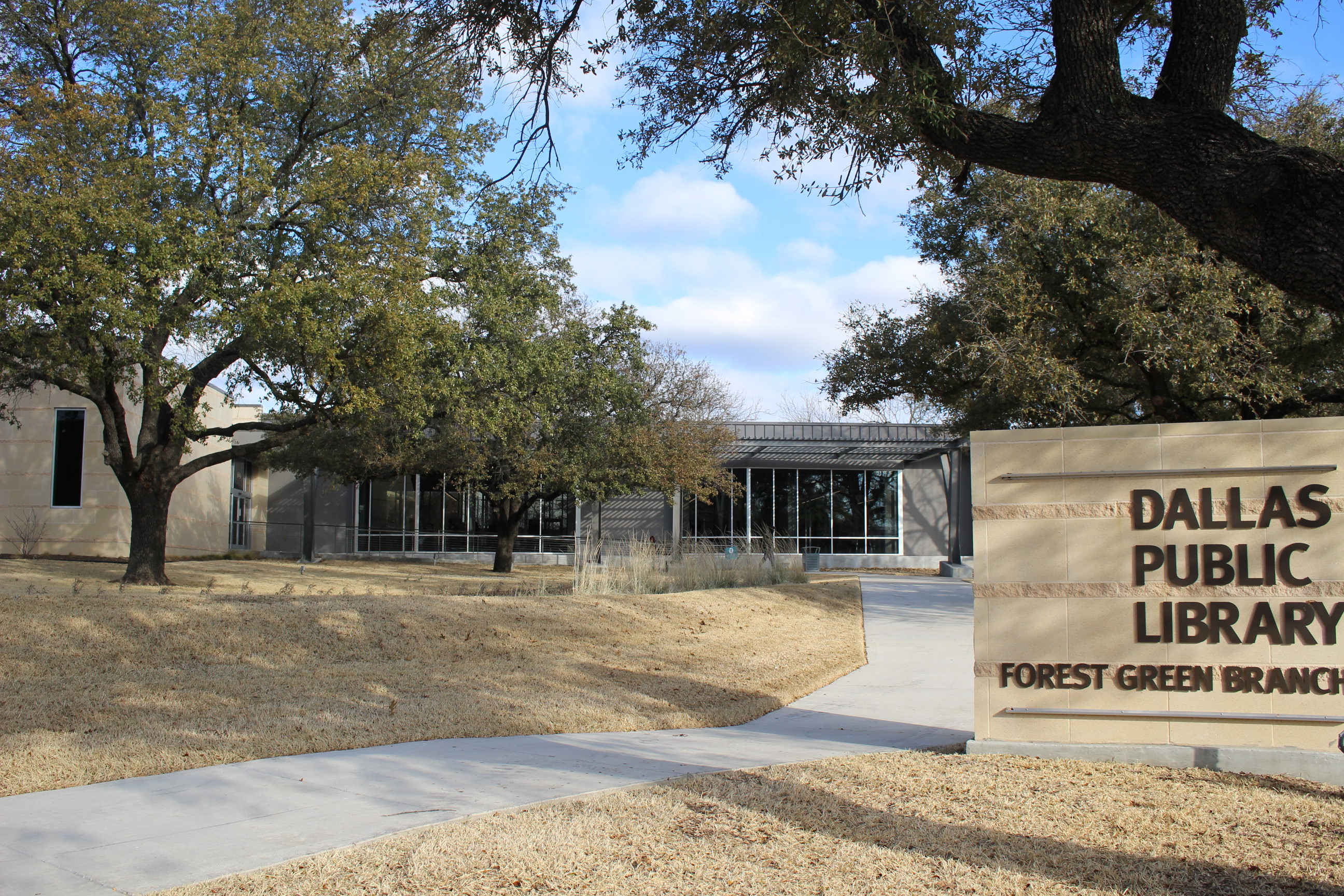
Dallas Public Library located in North Dallas

The area is served by nine branches of the Dallas Public Library system:

- Preston Royal Branch Library
- Bookmarks Branch Library
- Fretz Park Branch Library
- Audelia Road Branch Library
- Park Forest Branch Library
- Forest Green Branch Library
- Renner Frankford Branch Library
- Timberglen Branch Library
- Bachman Lake Branch Library

== Economy ==
North Dallas is home to the headquarters of Texas Instruments (TI). TI is the No. 4 manufacturer of semiconductors worldwide after Intel, Samsung and Toshiba, and is the No. 2 supplier of chips for cellular handsets after Qualcomm, and the No. 1 producer of digital signal processors (DSPs) and analog semiconductors, among a wide range of other semiconductor products. Major business areas in North Dallas include the Platinum Corridor, Preston Center, and the Telecom Corridor. Since 2016 both Studio Movie Grill and Pollo Campero have their headquarters in the Hidden Grove Office Building in North Dallas.

== Transportation ==
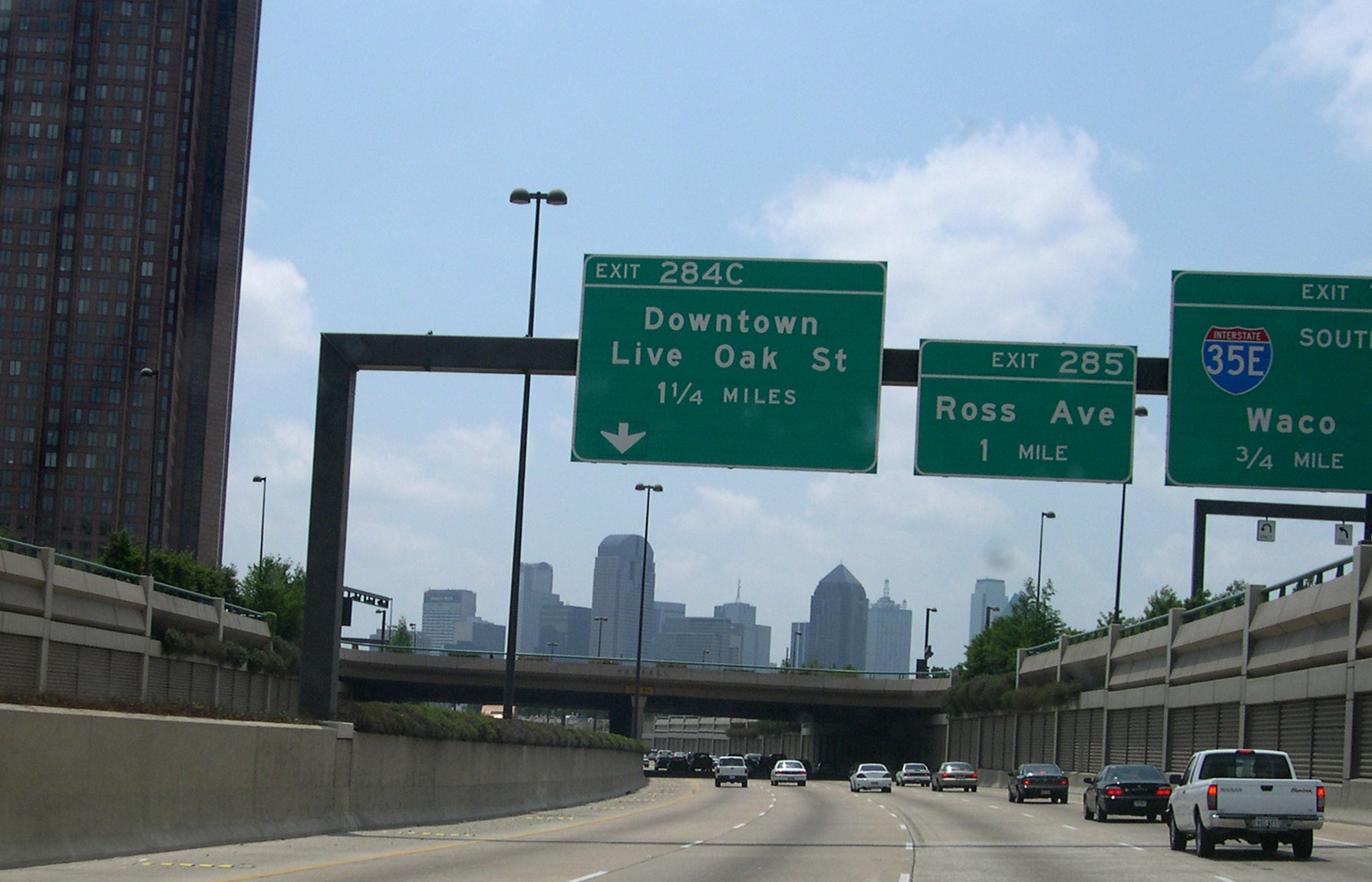
North Central Expressway (US 75) in North Dallas

Major and minor thoroughfares in Dallas and its enclaves

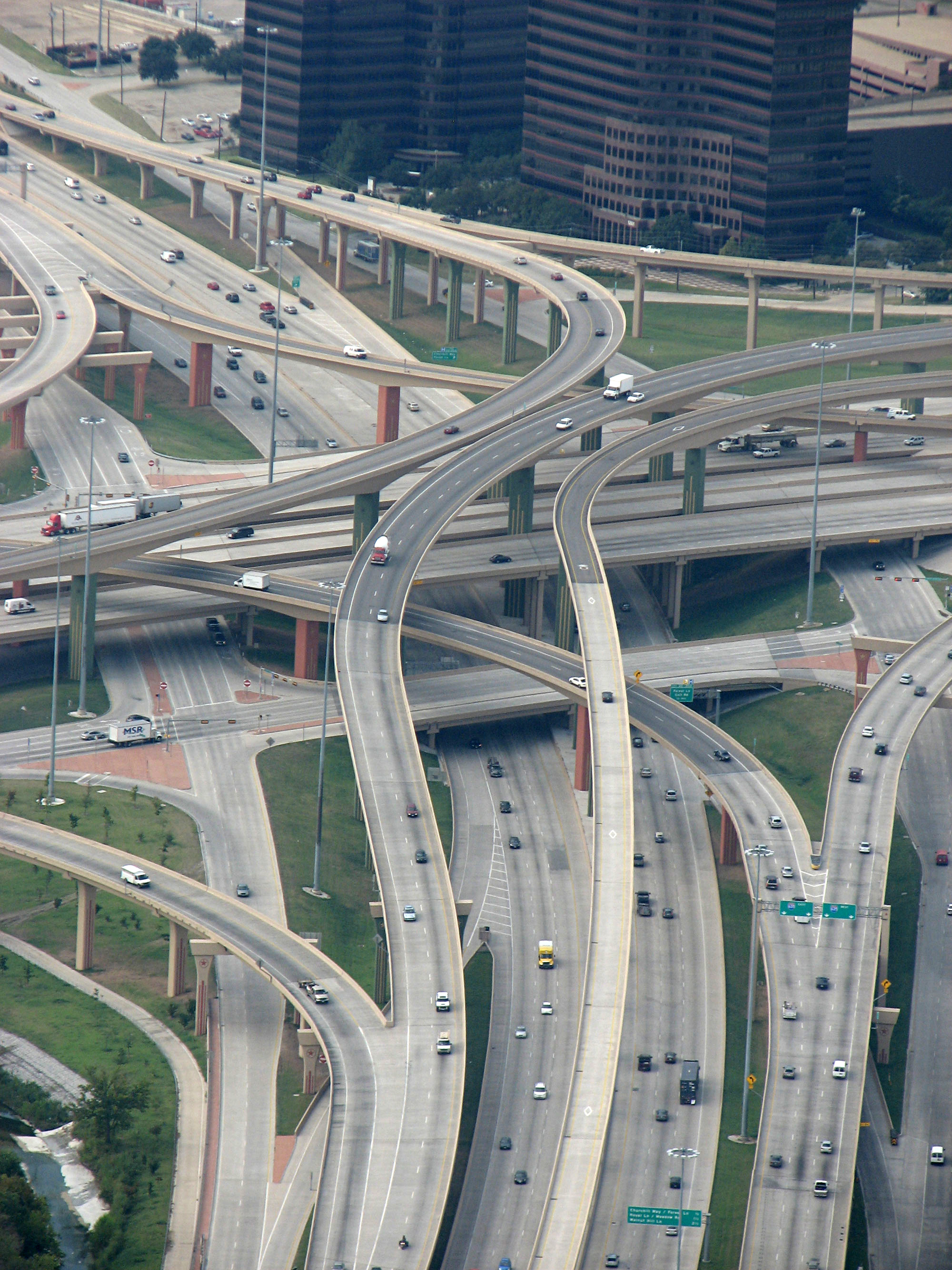
The Central Expressway and I-635 interchange in North Dallas, commonly known as the High Five Interchange

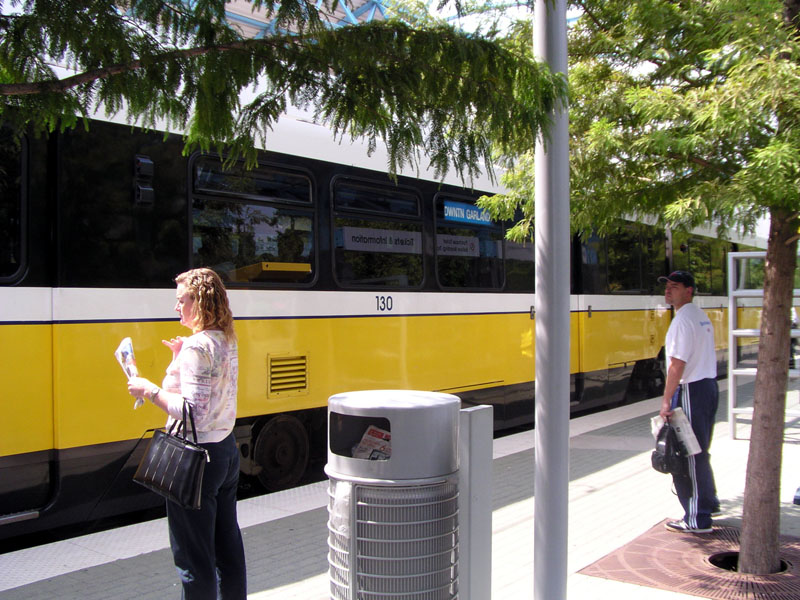
White Rock station, one of the train stations serving North Dallas

As the majority of North Dallas was developed in the late 20th century, the primary mode of local transportation is the automobile and the area has a low density compared with neighborhoods built in the early 20th century.

Efforts made by the City of Dallas and Dallas Area Rapid Transit to increase the availability of alternative modes of transportation have received varying degrees of support from North Dallas residents.

Since 1996, two light rail lines flanking North Dallas on the east have been constructed and well-received, and two more flank North Dallas on the west, in northwest Dallas. However, plans to build a commuter or light rail line through the North Dallas area along the "Cotton Belt" (the St. Louis Southwestern Railway) has met opposition from residents and local organizations.

North Dallas' road network was developed according to the street hierarchy school of urban design. Roads in the area are separated into major limited-access highways, high-capacity principal arterial roads, mid-capacity minor arterial roads, mid-capacity collector roads, and minor streets. The most organized of these systems is North Dallas' modified grid plan of principal arterial roads, which runs on a standard N/S/E/W grid.

=== Highways ===
The routing of limited-access highways through North Dallas is based on the area's proximity to Dallas' downtown freeway loop, as Dallas' freeway system was built according to the hub-and-spoke paradigm. North Dallas' major north-south highways radiate out of the downtown freeway loop and cut through North Dallas at various angles.

- Interstate 35E runs northwest/southeast.
- Dallas North Tollway runs north/south.
- U.S. Highway 75 (Central Expressway) runs northeast/southwest.

Additionally, four separate beltways arc across North Dallas: in order from their proximity to downtown:

- Northwest Highway (Loop 12)
- Interstate 635
- Belt Line Road
- President George Bush Turnpike

=== Light rail ===
DART began operating its light rail lines in North Dallas in 1996: The Red Line connects North Dallas to Oak Cliff, south Dallas, downtown, Uptown, Richardson and Plano. The Blue Line connects North Dallas to south Dallas, downtown, Uptown, east Dallas, Lake Highlands, and Garland. The Green Line and Orange Line lines run just to the west of North Dallas in northwest Dallas. The two lines serve DFW Airport, Irving and Las Colinas, Carrollton, Farmers Branch, the Stemmons Corridor, Victory Park, downtown, Deep Ellum, Fair Park, south Dallas and Pleasant Grove. Lines and stations in North Dallas include:

- Blue Line

LBJ/Skillman station
Lake Highlands station
White Rock station

- Red Line and Orange Line

LBJ/Central station
Forest Lane station
Walnut Hill station
Park Lane Station
Lovers Lane station

=== Air ===
Dallas's Love Field Airport is located in North Dallas, near the Bluff View and Devonshire neighborhoods. The Dallas-Fort Worth Metroplex's major international airport, Dallas/Fort Worth International Airport, is located a short distance to the northwest. Additionally, Addison Airport, a general aviation airport, is located adjacent to North Dallas in Addison.

== See also ==
- North Dallas Chamber of Commerce
