= Lake Park Estates, Dallas =

Neighborhood in Dallas, Texas, USA

Lake Park Estates
- Neighborhood
- Location in Dallas
- Country: United States
- State: Texas
- County: Dallas
- City: Dallas
- Area: East Dallas
- Elevation: 515 ft (157 m)
- ZIP code: 75218
- Area codes: 214, 469, 972
- Website: Official website

Lake Park Estates is a neighborhood in east Dallas, Texas (USA) on the north corner of the diagonal intersection of Buckner Road (Loop 12) and Garland Road (SH 78). It is bordered by the Casa Linda Shopping Center, Casa Linda Estates, Old Lake Highlands, Eastwood, and Dallas's White Rock Lake Park.

== About ==
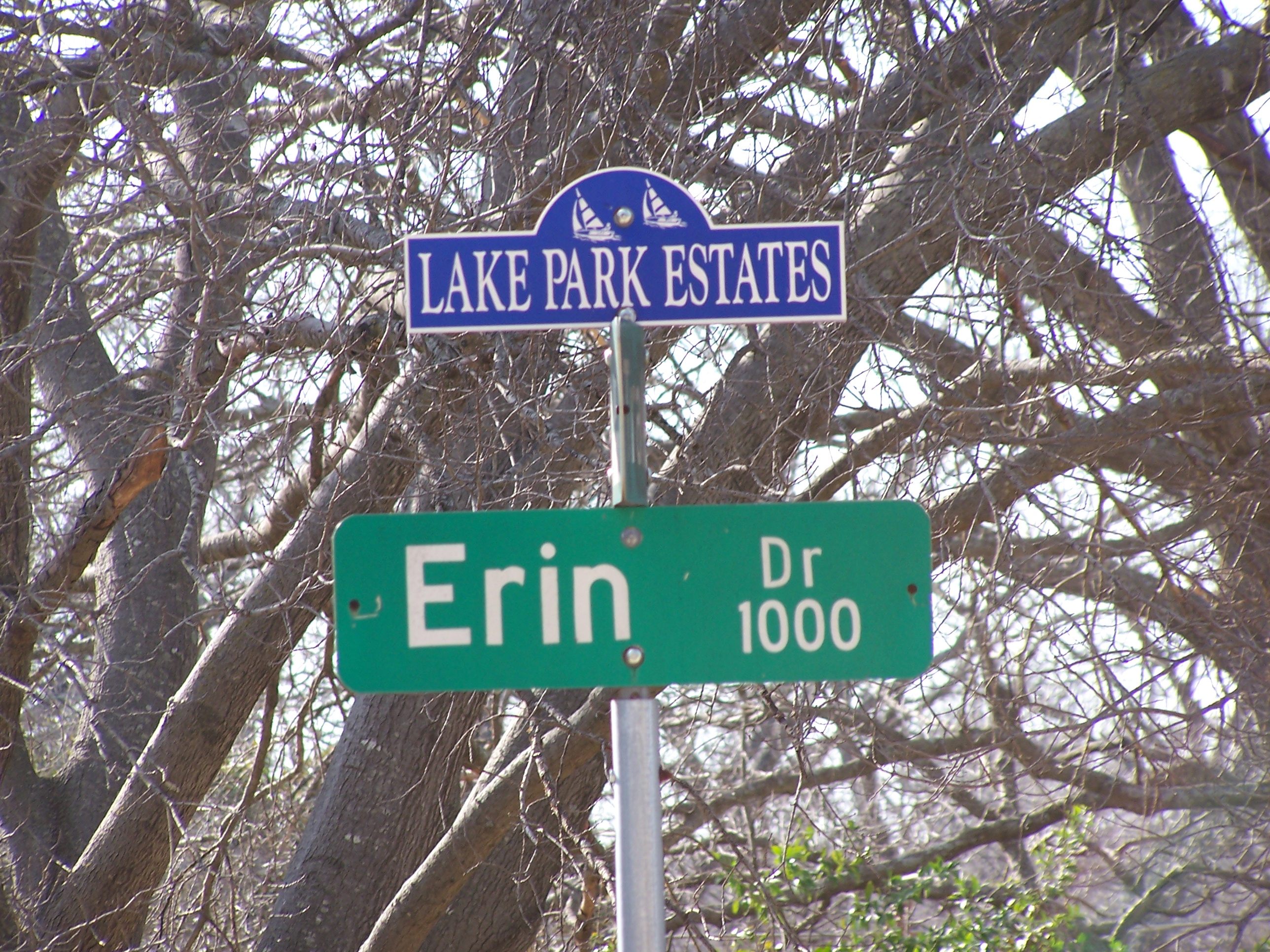
Sign topper on Lake Park Estates street signs.

Lake Park Estates contains 288 homes, most of which were built in the 1950s and 1960s. The neighborhood features variations on traditional ranch style houses, and it has some eclectic homes, including a notable home designed by Glenn Allen Galaway, a student of architect Philip Johnson.

All but one of the streets in the neighborhood are named after Irish locations or themes: Donegal, County Cork, Waterford, Athlone, Kilarney, Tralee, Erin, Galway, Tipperary, Bridget, Limerick, and Wicklow. The sole exception is Tranquilla, which continues up from Casa Linda Estates, a neighborhood with Spanish-inspired street names.

The neighborhood is represented and served by the Lake Park Estates Neighborhood Association, a Texas nonprofit corporation.

== Education ==
The neighborhood is served by the Dallas Independent School District. Children in the neighborhood attend Victor H. Hexter Elementary School, Robert T. Hill Middle School, and Bryan Adams High School.
