= Little Forest Hills, Dallas =

Neighborhood in Dallas, Texas, USA

Little Forest Hills
- Neighborhood
- Location within DFW Location within Texas Location within the United States
- Coordinates: 32°49′18.2″N 96°42′26.37″W
- Country: United States
- State: Texas
- County: Dallas
- City: Dallas
- Area: East Dallas
- ZIP code: 75218
- Area codes: 214, 469, 972

Little Forest Hills is a neighborhood in east Dallas, Texas (USA). It is south east of White Rock Lake.

== History ==
Development of Little Forest Hills began after White Rock Lake was completed in 1910 with development taking off in the 1930s. The neighborhood's collection of wood-framed 1930s and 40s homes were originally recreational lake houses and hunting cabins. At the time this area was considered the out skirts of town.

The 1980s and 90s saw an influx of artists attracted to the relative affordability of the homes and the close proximity to the lake. The neighborhood soon mirrored it residents whose talent manifested in the colorful landscaping and creative ornamentation. In recent years the neighborhood has experienced gentrification as more affluent professionals have renovated and expanded the smaller homes.

== Boundaries ==
Little Forest Hills is a neighborhood in east Dallas.

The area is bordered by:

- Lakeland Drive & Forest Hills (Southwest)
- Old Gate Lane & Casa Linda Estates (Northeast)
- Garland Road (Northwest)
- Train tracks & Casa Linda Forest (Southeast)

Notable areas near Little Forest Hills include White Rock Lake and Dallas Arboretum and Botanical Garden to the northwest, and Casa Linda Shopping Center to the northeast.

== Education ==
The neighborhood is served by the Dallas Independent School District. Children in the neighborhood attend Alex Sanger Elementary School, Alex Sanger Preparatory M.S, W. H. Gaston Middle School, and Bryan Adams High School.

== Pop culture ==
The neighborhood was the setting for a 2007 documentary about urban sprawl entitled Subdivided: Isolation and Community in America. The movie, by Dean Terry, held up Little Forest Hills as an example of 'good' development. The documentary, critical of tear-down construction and master planned subdivisions, was featured on KERA and received critical acclaim from the Dallas Observer.

== Notable residents ==
- Sean Kirkpatrick – keyboardist for avant-garde band the pAper chAse
