= Lochwood, Dallas =

Neighborhood of Dallas, Texas, USA

Lochwood
- Neighborhood
- Interactive map of Lochwood
- Coordinates: 32°51′8.46″N 96°41′33.44″W
- Country: United States of America
- State: Texas
- County: Dallas County
- City: Dallas
- Time zone: UTC-6:00 (CST)
  - Summer (DST): UTC-5:00 (CDT)

Lochwood is a neighborhood in east Dallas, Texas (USA) adjacent to Lake Park Estates and Old Lake Highlands. It is located east of White Rock Lake and sometimes referred to as 'Dixon Branch' because of the creek by that name running through the neighborhood.

== Boundaries ==
The Lochwood neighborhood is roughly pentagonal in shape, and is bounded on the north by East Northwest Highway (Texas Spur 244 or Texas State Highway Loop 12), on the west by East Lake Highlands Drive, on the southwest by Easton Road, on the southeast by Garland Road (Texas State Highway 78) and on the east by Jupiter Road.

== About ==
The area surrounds the Dixon Branch of White Rock Creek, east of White Rock Lake. The neighborhood was built starting after World War II and features many one- and two-story Ranch-style homes. Commercially, the area is anchored by White Rock Marketplace, formerly Lochwood Shopping Center (renamed "Treehouse" in 1976, then back to Lochwood Mall by the early 1980s). The mall, opened in 1957, once housed Titche's Department Store. The mall shut down around 1989.

The neighborhood is approximately one square mile and has about 2,000 households. The neighborhood is revered for its abundance of mature trees, walking and hiking trails, proximity to White Rock Lake, and mid-century style homes. The median price for a single family home in Lochwood was approximately $330,000 as of mid-2017.

== Education ==
The neighborhood is served by the Dallas Independent School District. Children in the neighborhood attend Martha Turner Reilly Elementary School (located within the neighborhood), Robert T. Hill Middle School, and Bryan Adams High School.
