= Eastwood, Dallas =

Neighborhood in East Dallas, Texas, USA

Eastwood
- Neighborhood
- Location within DFW Location within Texas Location within the United States
- Coordinates: 32°50′41.12″N 96°42′0.07″W
- Country: United States of America
- State: Texas
- County: Dallas County
- City: Dallas
- Time zone: UTC-6:00 (CST)
  - Summer (DST): UTC-5:00 (CDT)

Eastwood is a neighborhood in east Dallas, Texas (USA) adjacent to Lake Park Estates, Old Lake Highlands, and Lochwood. It is located near White Rock Lake.

== Boundaries ==
Eastwood is east of Peavy and west of Easton, south of Lake Highlands Drive, and north of Lake Gardens (including both sides of the street).

== Education ==
The neighborhood is served by the Dallas Independent School District. Children in the neighborhood attend Victor H. Hexter Elementary School, Robert T. Hill Middle School, and Bryan Adams High School.
