= East Dallas =

- Area of Dallas
- Country: United States
- State: Texas
- Counties: Dallas
- City: Dallas

Population (2016)
  - Total: 144,008
- ZIP codes: 75204, 75206, 75214, 75218, 75223, 75226, 75228,75246
- Area codes: 214, 469, 972

East Dallas, also referred to by the East Dallas Chamber of Commerce as the Lake & Garden District, is an expansive area of numerous communities and neighborhoods in Dallas, Texas, United States that border nearby suburban cities to the east such as Garland, Mesquite and Balch Springs.

White Rock Lake, located in the center of East Dallas, is considered "the crown jewel of the Dallas parks system". The lake, along with the Dallas Arboretum and Botanical Garden located on the east side of the lake, have strongly influenced and shaped the identity of the East Dallas area.

== Geography ==
=== Overview ===
East Dallas is bounded by Northwest Highway on the north, Garland and Mesquite on the east, Interstate 30 on the south, and Central Expressway on the west. East Dallas touches Highland Park, University Park, and Uptown on the west, North Dallas and Lake Highlands on the north, Garland and Mesquite on the east, and South and Southeast Dallas on the south.

== Neighborhoods ==
Due to East Dallas stretching across a large section of the city, the locations of neighborhoods are generally categorized into smaller sub-areas. The neighborhoods in the following sub-areas are considered part of East Dallas:

=== Greater M-Streets/Greenville area ===
West of White Rock Lake and north of Old East Dallas, neighborhoods are generally grouped under the heading of the Lakewood or the M-Streets/Greenville areas. Lakewood and Greenland Hills (also known as the M-Streets) are themselves neighborhoods of their own; however due to their prominence, the surrounding neighborhoods are generalized as belonging to one of the neighborhoods. Skillman Street is often used as a dividing line between the two areas, as the road is also the dividing line for the 75206 and 75214 zip codes.

- Glencoe Park
- Greenland Hills (M Streets)
- Lower Greenville, including subsections Belmont and Stonewall Terrace
- Lowest Greenville
- North Stonewall Terrace
- Vickery Place
- The Village
- University Crossing/Upper Greenville

=== Greater Lakewood area ===
The Lakewood area is located between Skillman Street on the west and White Rock Lake on the east.

- Abrams-Brookside
- Caruth Terrace
- Edgemont Park
- Fisher Heights
- Hillside
- Hollywood/Santa Monica
- Lakewood, which in turn contains several subsections:
  - The Cloisters
  - Greencove Estates
  - Lakewood Trails
  - Maplewood
  - Shore Acres
- Lakewood Heights
- Lakewood Hills
- Merriman Park/University Manor
- Mount Auburn
- Ridgewood Park
- Wilshire Heights
- University Meadows
- University Terrace

=== White Rock area ===
The White Rock area is located east of White Rock Lake, bounded by the Santa Fe railroad tracks to the southeast.

- Casa Linda Estates, which contains the subsection of Casa Linda Highlands
- Casa Vale
- Eastwood
- Emerald Isles
- Enclave at White Rock
- Forest Hills
- Gaston Park
- Highland on the Creek
- Lake Park Estates
- Little Forest Hills
- Lochwood
- Old Lake Highlands
- The Peninsula

=== Far East Dallas ===
Far East Dallas encompasses the portion of East Dallas located beyond the Santa Fe railroad tracks, stretching to the city limits of Garland and Mesquite.

- Alger Park-Ash Creek
- Braeburn Glen
- Briarwood
- Casa Linda Forest
- Casa View, including its several subsections:
  - Casa View Haven
  - Casa View Oaks
  - Little Casa View
- Club Manor
- Country Club Park
- Crest View Park
- Eastwood Hills
- Fairway Estates
- Forest Meade
- Forest Oaks
- Linda Heights
- St. Andrew's
- White Rock Forest
- White Rock Hills, including its subsections:
  - Claremont Addition
  - Hillridge
  - Lakeland Hills
  - White Rock Village

=== Old East Dallas ===
Old East Dallas, and its neighborhoods, are often viewed as a distinct area from East Dallas.

- Baylor-Meadows
- Bryan Place
- Cityplace
- Cochran Heights
- Deep Ellum
- East Columbia Place
- East Village, including subsection Belmont Park
- Henderson
- Junius Heights
- Munger Place
- Peak's Suburban Addition
- Roseland
- Santa Fe
- Swiss Avenue

== Population ==
A total of 144,008 people lived in the area, according to the 2016 U.S. census estimate. The median age for residents was 35.8

According to the 2016 Census estimate, 65.8% of the population was White, 12.7% was Black, 2.7% Asian, 18.8% from two or more races. 36.6% of the total population was of Hispanic or Latino origin.

48.9% of residents are male, 51.1% are female. 74.3% are age 18 or over. 37.1% have never been married, 45.4% are married, 5.8% are widowed, and 11.7% are divorced.

The median household income in 2016 dollars was $55,783, considered above average for both the city and county. 56.6% of East Dallas homes are detached, single-family houses. The median owner-occupied home value is $231,335. The average household size is 2.38. Homeowners occupied 54.7% of the housing units, and renters occupied the rest.

== Education ==
East Dallas residents aged 25 and older holding a four-year degree amounted to 23.0% of the population in 2016, considered average when compared with the city and the county as a whole, as were the percentages of residents with a bachelor's or a postgraduate degree.

=== Public (DISD) ===
Grade listings are current as of the 2007–2008 school year.

==== Elementary schools ====
- Bayles Elementary School PK-5
- Casa View Elementary SchoolPK-5
- SS Conner Elementary School PK-5
- Paul L. Dunbar Elementary School PK-5
- Geneva Heights Elementary School (formerly Robert E. Lee Elementary School) PK-5
- Charles A. Gill Elementary School PK-5
- Frank Guzick Elementary School PK - 5
- Victor H. Hexter Elementary School PK-5
- Edwin J. Kiest Elementary School PK-5
- Lakewood Elementary School PK-5
- William B. Lipscomb Elementary School PK-5
- Mockingbird Elementary School (formerly Stonewall Jackson Elementary School) PK-5
- Mount Auburn Elementary School PK-3
- Martha Turner Reilly Elementary School PK-5
- Eduardo Mata Elementary School 4–5
- Reinhardt Elementary SchoolPK-5
- Oran M. Roberts Elementary School PK-5
- Edna Rowe Elementary School PK - 5
- Alex Sanger Elementary School PK-5
- Larry Smith Elementary PK-5
- George Truett Elementary School PK-5

==== Middle schools ====
- W.H. Gaston Middle School 6–8
- Alex Sanger Preparatory school6-8
- Robert T. Hill Middle School 6–8
- Harold Wendell Lang Sr. Middle School 6–8
- J.L. Long Middle School 6-8 Site

==== High schools ====
- Bryan Adams High School 9–12
- Woodrow Wilson High School 9–12

=== Private ===
- Bishop Lynch High School 9-12

=== Higher education ===
- Baylor College of Dentistry
- Texas A&M College of Medicine
