= Ridgewood Park =

Ridgewood Park may refer to:

- Ridgewood Park (Tampa), a neighborhood within the City of Tampa, Florida
- Ridgewood Park (baseball ground), a former baseball ground in Ridgewood, New York
- Ridgewood Park, Dallas, Texas, a neighborhood in East Dallas, Texas
- Mafera Park in Queens, New York City, formerly called Ridgewood Park
