= Casa View, Dallas =

Northeast Dallas, Texas neighborhood

Casa View
- Neighborhood
- Location within DFW Location within Texas Location within the United States
- Coordinates: 32°50′10.53″N 96°40′20.05″W
- Country: United States of America
- State: Texas
- County: Dallas County
- City: Dallas
- Time zone: UTC-6:00 (CST)
  - Summer (DST): UTC-5:00 (CDT)

Casa View is a residential neighborhood in Dallas, Texas, United States, located near White Rock Lake in the northeastern portion of the city. According to the Greater Casa View Alliance, the Greater Casa View area is bordered by Buckner Boulevard, Garland Road, I-635 and Oates to the city line of neighboring Mesquite. The area has traditionally been nearly synonymous with the adjoining Casa Linda neighborhood but is gaining momentum in its own right and was named by D Magazine as one of "5 Neighborhoods on the Rise" in its July 2016 issue.

In the 1960s Casa View was mostly white and Protestant and Roman Catholic. By the early 2010s it had become mostly Hispanic. Today, Casa View is a diverse and progressive neighborhood with a high concentration of single-family homes, including the state's largest enclave of mid-century modern homes designed by architect Cliff May.

== Shopping ==
The hub of shopping activity in the area, particularly in the 1960s and 1970s, was Casa View Shopping Center. Sears opened a store at Gus Thomasson Road and Ferguson roads in 1956. J. C. Penney was another anchor tenant.

It is also the home to a dance studio where Texie Waterman (November 25, 1931 - October 14, 1996) selected and coached the Dallas Cowboy Cheerleaders. The squad made its inaugural appearance in the 1972-73 football season. She was the instructor through 1983.

Another long-term tenant in the shopping center is Charles Blaylock Realtors. Blaylock was a Dallas firefighter who opened the agency in 1956. According to The Dallas Morning News as of 2006, he is "still at it and uses the moniker 'King of Casa View.'"

== Education ==
Dallas Independent School District operates area public schools. Zoned schools include:

- Casa View Elementary School
- Charles A. Gill Elementary School
- George W. Truett Elementary School
- Reinhardt Elementary School
- Edwin J. Kiest Elementary School
- W. H. Gaston Middle School
- Robert T. Hill Middle School
- Bryan Adams High School

Dallas Public Library operates the Lochwood Library. Previously it operated the Casa View Branch, opened on February 29, 1964. The branch was closed in 2008 to be replaced with the Lochwood Library at the intersection of Jupiter and Garland roads.
