= Baylor-Meadows, Dallas =

Neighborhood in east Dallas, Texas

Coordinates: 32°47′21″N 96°47′12″W

Baylor-Meadows is a neighborhood in east Dallas, Texas (USA). The neighborhood is anchored by the Baylor Medical Center, The Wilson Historic District, and the Dallas Latino Cultural Center.

== Wilson Historic District ==
The Wilson Historic District is owned and maintained by the Meadows Foundation, and comprises a number of restored Victorian homes. It was established in 1981 to provide rent-free office space for non-profit organizations.

== Baylor University Medical Center at Dallas ==
Baylor University Medical Center at Dallas is a not-for-profit hospital. It has 914 licensed beds and is one of the major centers for patient care, medical training and research North Texas. In 2017, it was named by the U.S. News & World Report in its list of "America's Best Hospitals" for the twenty-fifth consecutive year.

== Latino Cultural Center ==
The Latino Cultural Center in Dallas serves as a regional center for the preservation, development, and promotion of Latino and Hispanic arts and culture. The 27,000 square-foot facility, known for its vivid colors and solid exteriors, was designed by architect Ricardo Legorreta and opened in 2003. It contains a 300-seat theater, a multi-purpose room, an art gallery and sculpture courtyards that are widely used by local, regional, and international artists.
