= Bath House Cultural Center =

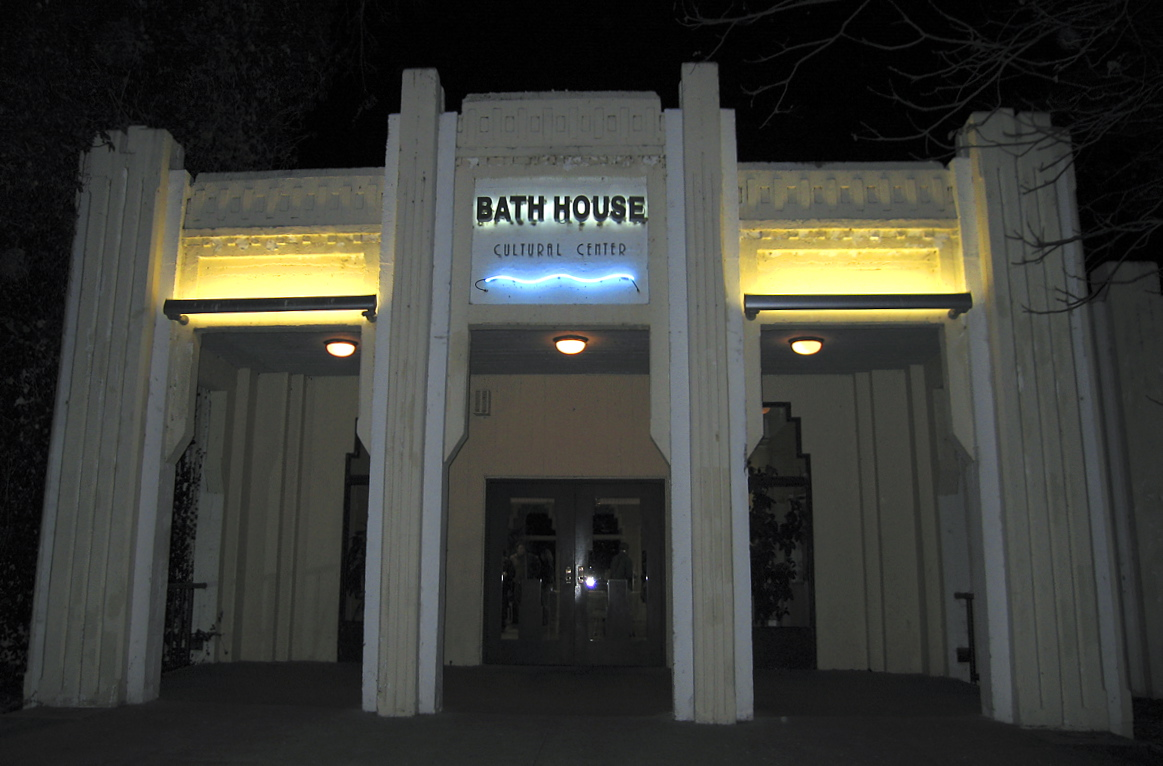
- Center at night

- Location within Texas Location within the United States
- 32°50′27″N 96°42′55″W
- Location: Dallas, Texas

History
- Built: 1930

Site notes
- Architectural style: Art Deco

Dallas Landmark
- Official name: White Rock Bath House

The Bath House Cultural Center is the first of six neighborhood cultural centers built and operated by the City of Dallas Office of Cultural Affairs. It is located on the east shore of White Rock Lake in east Dallas, Texas (USA). It serves all of Dallas, especially the eastern region of the city.

== History ==
The Bath House (one of the first Art Deco buildings in the South) is a Dallas Landmark and was originally completed in 1930. It was designed by Dallas architect Jon Carsey, who was influenced by the Paris Exposition of 1925. When it opened, the Municipal Bath House (as it was then known) was used by the citizens of Dallas as an escape from the summer heat. There was a sandy beach that extended from the building out into the lake, locker rooms on the ground floor and concession stands in the basement. In 1958 the Bath House closed and swimming was prohibited to allow the lake to be used as a water supply for the city. The building remained empty and unused for over twenty years. In 1980, the Dallas City Arts Program, the Park and Recreation Department and the East Dallas Chamber of Commerce joined together to renovate the old Bath House. It became the first neighborhood cultural center in the city.

== Today ==
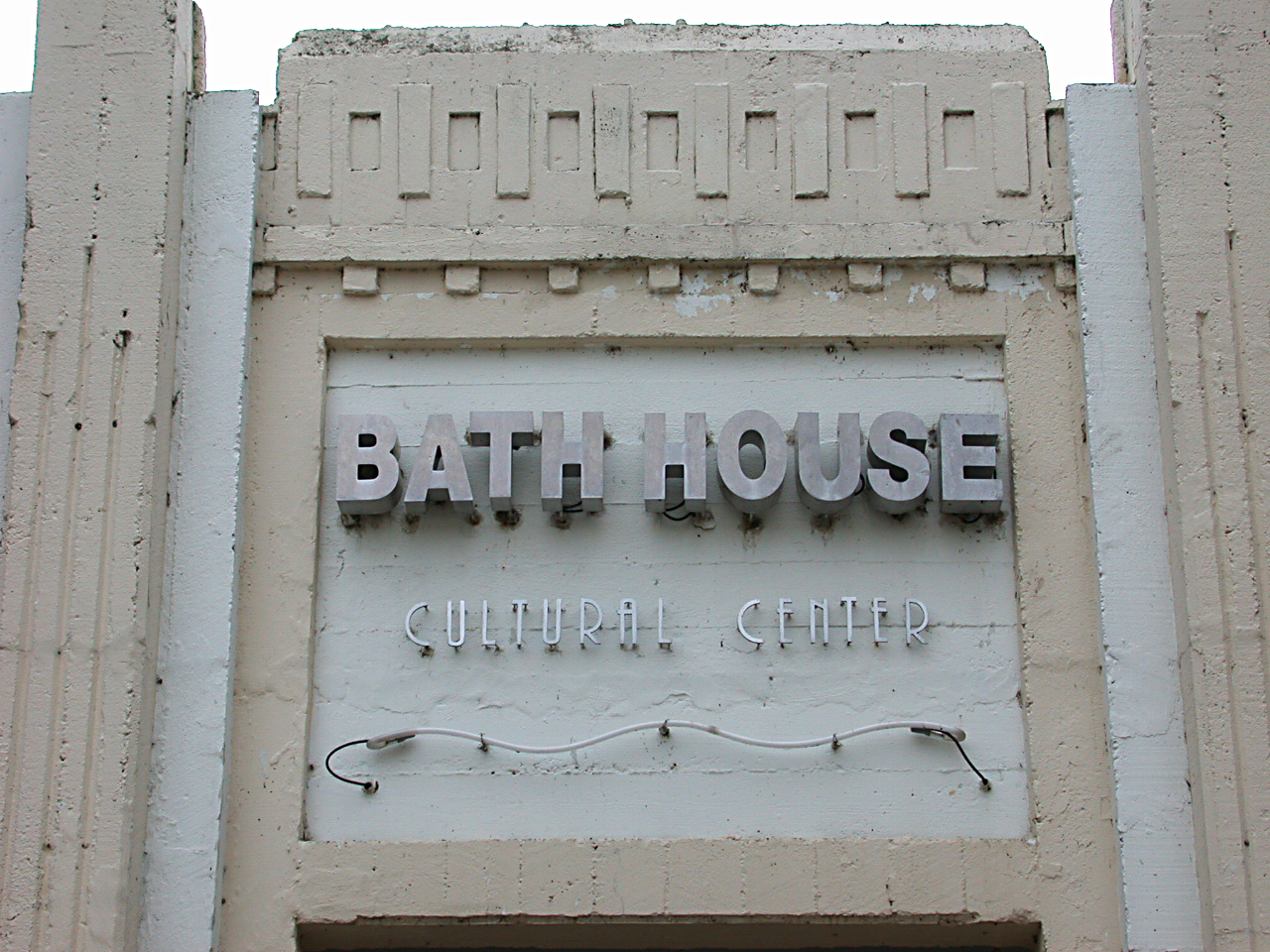
Art deco facade, close up

Today the Bath House Cultural Center serves the artists and independent theatres of Dallas. It presents 15-20 exhibits and over 200 performances, concerts, festivals, workshops, lectures and other events per year.

Highlights of the building include:

- A large gallery space for artist exhibitions
- A black box theatre for theatrical performances and concerts
- Outdoor amphitheatre
- The Water Theatre, a public art piece designed to attract birds and other wildlife
- Proximity to White Rock Lake Park

=== White Rock Lake Museum ===
Opened in 2004, the White Rock Lake Museum focuses on the park's natural history and cultural history of the area, including local wildlife, the Blackland Prairie and ancient Indian settlements.

== Activities ==
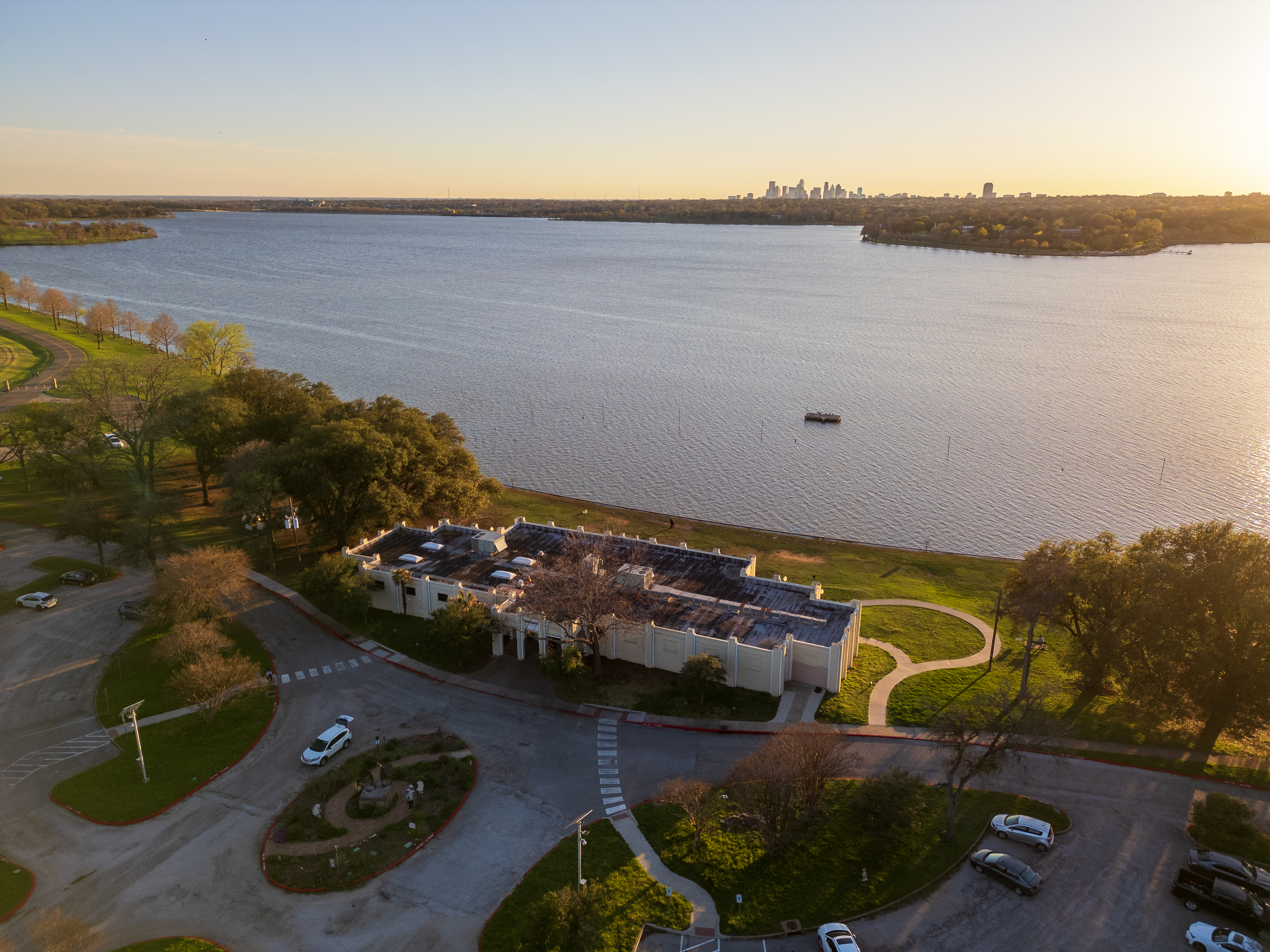
Bath House Cultural Center overlooking White Rock Lake in Dallas, Texas.

Every summer, the Bath House produces the Festival of Independent Theatres. The festival serves as a showcase for various Dallas independent theatres without a permanent home and has become a signature event for the Bath House Cultural Center.

Every fall and spring the Bath House holds its semiannual Art Mart. The Art Mart showcases different artists from Texas (usually around 40). The artists work in a wide variety of media, including, painters, photographers, sculptors, metal workers, jewelry makers and many more. In addition to the art sale, there is food, music and a silent auction.

In September 2006 the Bath House Cultural Center celebrated its 25th anniversary.

== Other Dallas Cultural Centers ==
- Dallas City Performance Hall in the Arts District of downtown
- Ice House Cultural Center in north Oak Cliff
- Juanita Craft Civil Rights House in south Dallas
- Latino Cultural Center in Deep Ellum
- Meyerson Symphony Center in the Arts District of downtown
- South Dallas Cultural Center in south Dallas
