= Merriman Park/University Manor, Dallas =

Merriman Park/University Manor
- Neighborhood of Dallas
- Country: United States
- State: Texas
- County: Dallas
- City: Dallas
- Area: White Rock Lake
- Elevation: 522 ft (159 m)
- ZIP code: 75231
- Area codes: 214, 469, 972
- Website: http://www.mpum.com

Merriman Park/University Manor is a neighborhood located in the White Rock Lake area of Dallas, Texas, United States.

== Education ==
Students living in the Merriman Park/University Manor neighborhood attend Dallas Independent School District schools. Schools include Hotchkiss Elementary School, Tasby Middle School, and Conrad High School.

== Transportation ==
Dallas Area Rapid Transit's Blue Line serves the neighborhood via White Rock station, which also provides a connection to the White Rock Creek Trail.
