= Casa Linda Estates, Dallas =

Neighborhood in East Dallas, Texas, US

Casa Linda Estates
- Neighborhood
- Location within DFW Location within Texas Location within the United States
- Coordinates: 32.829°N 96.698°W
- Country: United States
- State: Texas
- County: Dallas County
- City: Dallas
- Time zone: UTC-6:00 (CST)
  - Summer (DST): UTC-5:00 (CDT)

Casa Linda Estates, or simply Casa Linda, is a neighborhood in east Dallas, Texas, United States. Situated to the south and east of White Rock Lake and to the south of Garland Road (SH 78), it falls under Dallas Council District 9.

The neighborhood features half acre and larger, tree-lined estates along winding roads. Residents are near to White Rock Lake, the Bath House Cultural Center, the Dallas Arboretum, and Casa Linda Shopping Center.

== History ==
The history of Casa Linda Estates dates back to its earlier names of Ola and Reinhardt prior to redevelopment as Casa Linda. Dallas annexed Reinhardt in 1948. The 640-acre area was purchased by Carl Martin Brown and his wife Ida May James Brown on January 1, 1933. They initially farmed the land until they could develop it for residential and commercial purposes.

The land's history can be traced back to Richardson Scurry, who was awarded the land for his participation in the Battle of San Jacinto. Upon his death, the land was sold by his attorney to W. Heedle. Over the course of 100 years, the land changed hands until it was acquired by the Browns.

The Browns transformed their family farm into Casa Linda Estates and a shopping center known as Casa Linda Plaza. The area's development included the installation of streets, electricity, and city water. Casa Linda Theatre was the first building completed after World War II. Deed restrictions were established in 1939 to maintain the area as a first-class neighborhood for white families. These restrictions included provisions for the use of premises for private dwelling purposes by white persons only, not excluding bona fide servants of any race. The architectural styles of homes in Casa Linda Estates vary, with some featuring Spanish Colonial Revival Style architecture, reflecting Howard D. Brown's love for the Spanish language. Streets in the area are named using Spanish words. The neighborhood is known for its abundant trees, well-kept landscaping, and some homes with servants' quarters that can be used for rentals or guest accommodations.

The Browns owned the shopping center until Howard D. Brown decided to sell it in late 1978 due to leukemia. His daughter, Beverly Ann Brown Heart, continued the family tradition of home building in the area until the mid-1980s. Casa Linda Plaza continued to thrive with a mix of new and old tenants, such as Chili's restaurant and El Fenix Restaurant, which has been a tenant since the mid-1950s. As of 2015, Casa Linda remains a vibrant neighborhood with a mix of longstanding and newer businesses.
