= Ridgewood Park, Dallas =

Neighborhood in Dallas, Texas, United States of America

Ridgewood Park
- Neighborhood
- Location within DFW Location within Texas Location within the United States
- Coordinates: 32°50′55.02″N 96°44′57.57″W
- Country: United States of America
- State: Texas
- County: Dallas County
- City: Dallas
- Time zone: UTC-6:00 (CST)
  - Summer (DST): UTC-5:00 (CDT)
- Website: www.ridgewoodpark.org

Ridgewood Park is a neighborhood in east Dallas Texas (USA). It is bordered by Lovers Lane on the north, Abrams Road on the west, the DART Blue Line on the south, and Fisher Road on the east.

The city of Dallas' Ridgewood/Belcher Recreation Center is located in the southeastern portion of the neighborhood.
