= Old Lake Highlands, Dallas =

Neighborhood in Dallas, Texas, USA

Old Lake Highlands
- Neighborhood
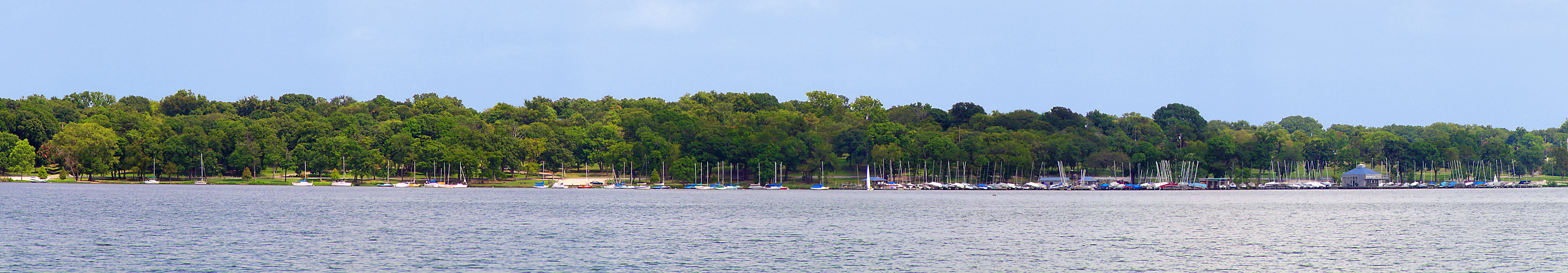
- The marina at White Rock Lake is adjacent to the neighborhood
- Interactive map of Old Lake Highlands
- Coordinates: 32°51′24.02″N 96°42′28.99″W
- Country: United States
- State: Texas
- County: Dallas
- City: Dallas
- Area: East Dallas
- Elevation: 531 ft (162 m)
- ZIP code: 75218
- Area codes: 214, 469, 972
- Website: http://www.oldlakehighlands.com/

Old Lake Highlands is a neighborhood in east Dallas, Texas (USA). It is adjacent to White Rock Lake. It is in Dallas Council District 9.

== About ==
The neighborhood contains around 1,700 homes, and is located inside the triangle formed by Lake Highlands Drive, Northwest Highway, and White Rock Lake. The area includes many parks along the creeks that feed into White Rock Lake including Norbuck Park at the southeast corner of Buckner and Northwest Highway.

== History ==
The homes in Old Lake Highlands range in age from 80 years up to new teardowns. The area has gone through many name changes. Before the opening of Lake Highlands High School in the nearby Richardson School District, the area now known as 'The Peninsula' was referred to as 'Lake Highlands.' Until 2006, the homes north of Northcliff and south of Northwest Highway were known as 'Lake Highlands Estates' and there was a marquee on Classen proclaiming the neighborhood as such. The areas originally known as 'Lake Terrace,' 'Lake Highlands Pointe.' 'Bel Aire Estates,' and 'Park Highlands' have all come together with the two aforementioned areas to form the Old Lake Highlands Neighborhood Association. The neighbors came together in the late 1990s in order to establish a stronger sense of community across an area that was not as widely prominent as the northern Lake Highlands area or Lakewood, Dallas across the water.

== Education ==
The neighborhood is served by the Dallas Independent School District. Children in the neighborhood attend Victor H. Hexter Elementary School (located within the neighborhood), Robert T. Hill Middle School (located within the neighborhood), St. John’s Episcopal School, and Bryan Adams High School.
