= 42nd Scripps National Spelling Bee =

Spelling bee held in the United States in 1969

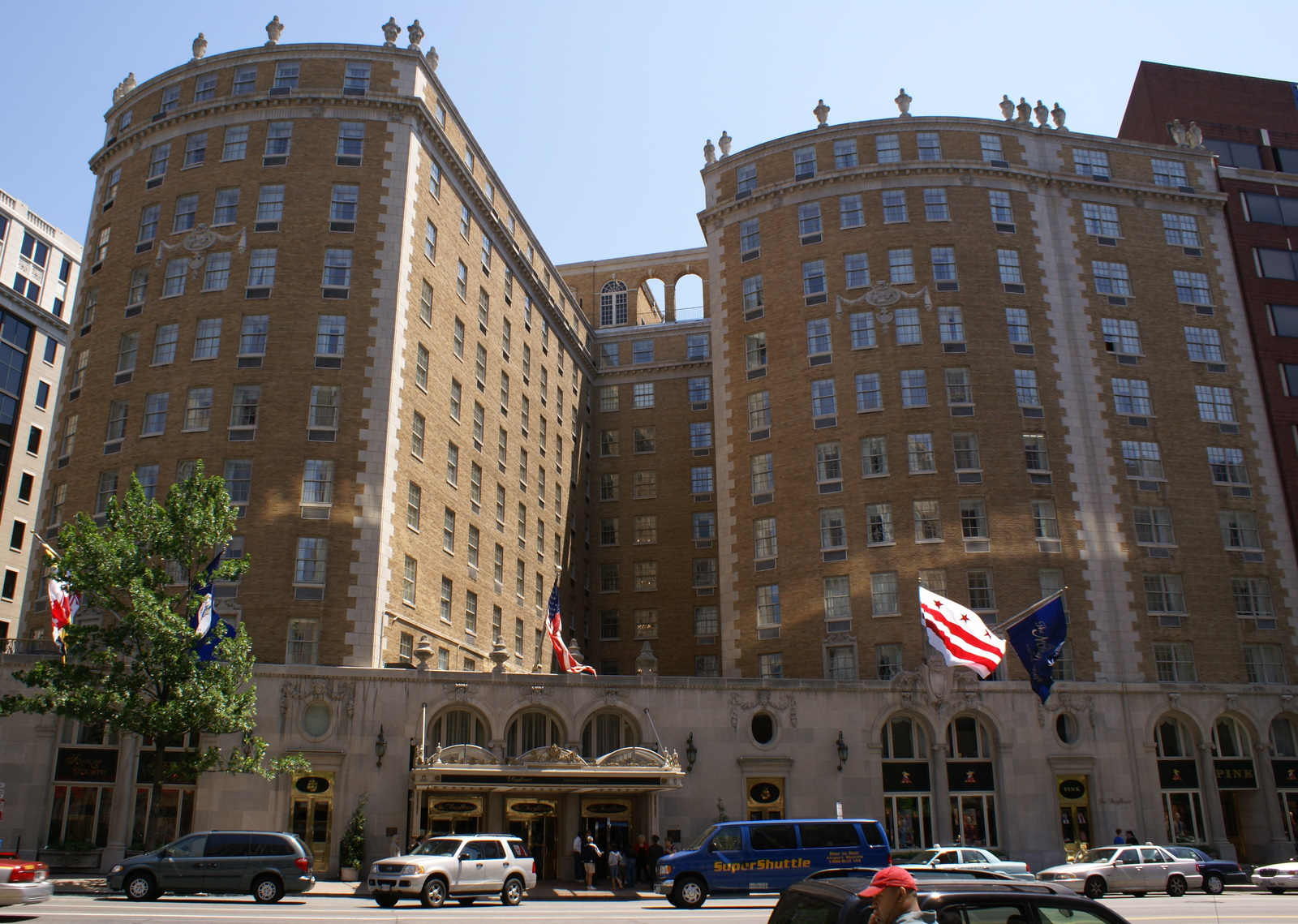
- The Mayflower Hotel, site of the 42nd National Spelling Bee
- Date: June 4–5, 1969
- Location: The Mayflower Hotel in Washington, D.C.
- Winner: Susan Yoachum (14 at time of win)
- Sponsor: Dallas Morning News
- Sponsor location: Dallas, Texas
- Winning word: interlocutory
- No. of contestants: 73
- Pronouncer: Richard R. Baker

The 42nd Scripps National Spelling Bee was held in Washington, D.C. at the Mayflower Hotel on June 4–5, 1969, sponsored by the E.W. Scripps Company.

The winner was 14-year-old Susan Yoachum of Texas, an 8th grade student at Hill Junior High School in Dallas, with the winning word "interlocutory". Yoachum later became a well-regarded journalist, rising to the post of political editor at the San Francisco Chronicle. She died of breast cancer at age 43 in June 1998.

Second place went to 14-year-old Margaret Matthees of Huntsville, Alabama, who fell on "egalitarian". David Groisser, age 12, of Brooklyn, finished third, misspelling "quoits" as "quytes".

First prize was $1000, second was $500, and third was $250.

There were 73 contestants this year. In the first day of competition, 464 words were used over nine rounds and the field was reduced to 23 participants. A total of 571 words were used by the end.
