= Bryan Adams High School =

High school in Dallas, Texas

Bryan Adams High School Leadership Academy
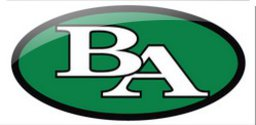

Location
- 2101 Millmar Drive; Dallas, Texas 75228; United States
- 32.827103°N 96.680125°W

Information
- Type: Public, Secondary
- Motto: “Striving for excellence.”
- Established: 1957
- School district: Dallas Independent School District
- NCES District ID: 4816230
- CEEB code: 441723
- NCES School ID: 481623001205
- Principal: Sarah Foster Arbaiza
- Teaching staff: 143.77(on an FTE basis)
- Grades: 9-12
- Enrollment: 2,253 (2023-2024)
  - Grade 9: 650
  - Grade 10: 590
  - Grade 11: 535
  - Grade 12: 478
- Student to teacher ratio: 15.67
- Colors: Kelly green and white
- Mascot: Cougar
- Website: Official Website

Bryan Adams High School Leadership Academy is a public high school located in the Casa View neighborhood of East Dallas, Texas, United States and is a part of the Dallas Independent School District. The school serves the area of Dallas east of White Rock Lake, south of Northwest Highway, north of Interstate 30, and inside the Dallas city limits. The school is classified as a 5A school by the UIL. In 2015, the school was rated "Met Standard" by the Texas Education Agency.

== History ==
Bryan Adams High School opened in 1957 and was named after William Jennings Bryan Adams, a DISD Board of Education secretary from 1929 until his death in 1955. The building was constructed at a cost of US$2.4 million and was designed by the architectural firm of Goodwin & Cavitt using the same pattern as their building for Thomas Jefferson High School, which opened in 1955. Students and alumni almost always refer to the school as 'Bryan Adams,' or simply by the acronym 'B.A.'

While 'Adams High School' is the name of several high schools throughout the United States, there is only one 'Bryan Adams High School.' It has no connection to Canadian singer Bryan Adams, who was born two years after the school's founding.

In the late 1960s and early 1970s Bryan Adams was one of the largest high schools in Texas, graduating more than 1,000 students in each of the years from 1968 to 1972. Most of its students were middle class and white. Since the opening of Conrad High School in 2006, B.A. has seen a noticeable decline in enrollment, dropping from the UIL largest classification for the first time in the 2008 realignment.

On October 6, 2010, the Dallas Independent School District announced that Bryan Adams would be reorganized after receiving the state's lowest rating for two straight years. The reorganization would take place for the 2011–2012 school year in a process known as "reconstitution," according to DISD spokesman Jon Dahlander. State law requires the academic shakeup for campuses that consistently are rated "academically unacceptable." Campus review teams at the schools, consisting of an internal and external member, will review students' performance on the state exam to determine which teachers should leave the schools, Dahlander said. Bryan Adams high school is on the low-performing list for its graduation rate, he said.

In 2015, DISD started a school of choice program for many schools in Dallas and Bryan Adams will begin to phase in a school-wide leadership model in a three- to five-year plan. Bryan Adams is among seven Dallas ISD choice schools that are planned to launch in the next couple of years. Unlike magnet schools, choice schools will not have any academic entry requirements. Enrollment is open to students district-wide, but priority is given to students in the school's attendance zone.

In 2021, Bryan Adams High School was renamed to Bryan Adams High School Leadership Academy.

== Administration ==
The principal of Bryan Adams High School is Sarah Foster Arbaiza.

== Athletics ==
The school competes in UIL district 11-5A with 5 other DISD schools and 2 schools in the Carrollton-Farmers Branch ISD. The BA Cougars compete in the following sports:

- Baseball
- Basketball
- Cross Country
- Football
- Golf
- Soccer
- Softball
- Swimming and Diving
- Tennis
- Track and Field
- Volleyball
- Wrestling

=== State Championship ===
The school's lone team to win a Texas state championship was the 1967 golf team.

== Notable alumni ==
- Gary Blair, head women's basketball coach for Texas A&M University. Class of 1963.
- Karen Brooks, American country music singer who is best known for a series of Top 40 hits on the Billboard Country Chart in the early 1980s, including "Faking Love," a duet with T. G. Sheppard that topped the country chart in February 1983. Class of 1972.
- John Carona, Texas State Senator. Class of 1974.
- Karin Cates, children's book writer
- Neil Cohen, professional soccer player. Class of 1973.
- Lincoln Coleman, former NFL running back for the Dallas Cowboys. Class of 1987.
- Jim Dauterive, executive producer of Bob's Burgers, executive producer and writer for King of the Hill; namesake of KotH character Bill Dauterive. Class of 1975.
- Doug English, former All-Pro NFL defensive tackle for the Detroit Lions. Class of 1971.
- Paco Estrada, grammy nominated songwriter and musician.
- A. Joe Fish, U.S. District Judge, Class of 1961.
- Ken Jolly, former NFL linebacker for the Kansas City Chiefs. Class of 1980.
- Kenyon Martin, power forward in the NBA. Class of 1996.
- Bob Phillips, Host of long-running television series Texas Country Reporter. Class of 1969.
- Susan Yoachum, 1969 National Spelling Bee champion; later a political writer and editor for the San Jose Mercury-News and San Francisco Chronicle. Class of 1973.
