= Dallas Arboretum and Botanical Garden =

Historic estate, arboretum, and botanical garden in East Dallas, Texas, United States

- DeGolyer Estate
- U.S. National Register of Historic Places
- Texas State Antiquities Landmark
- Recorded Texas Historic Landmark
- Dallas Landmark
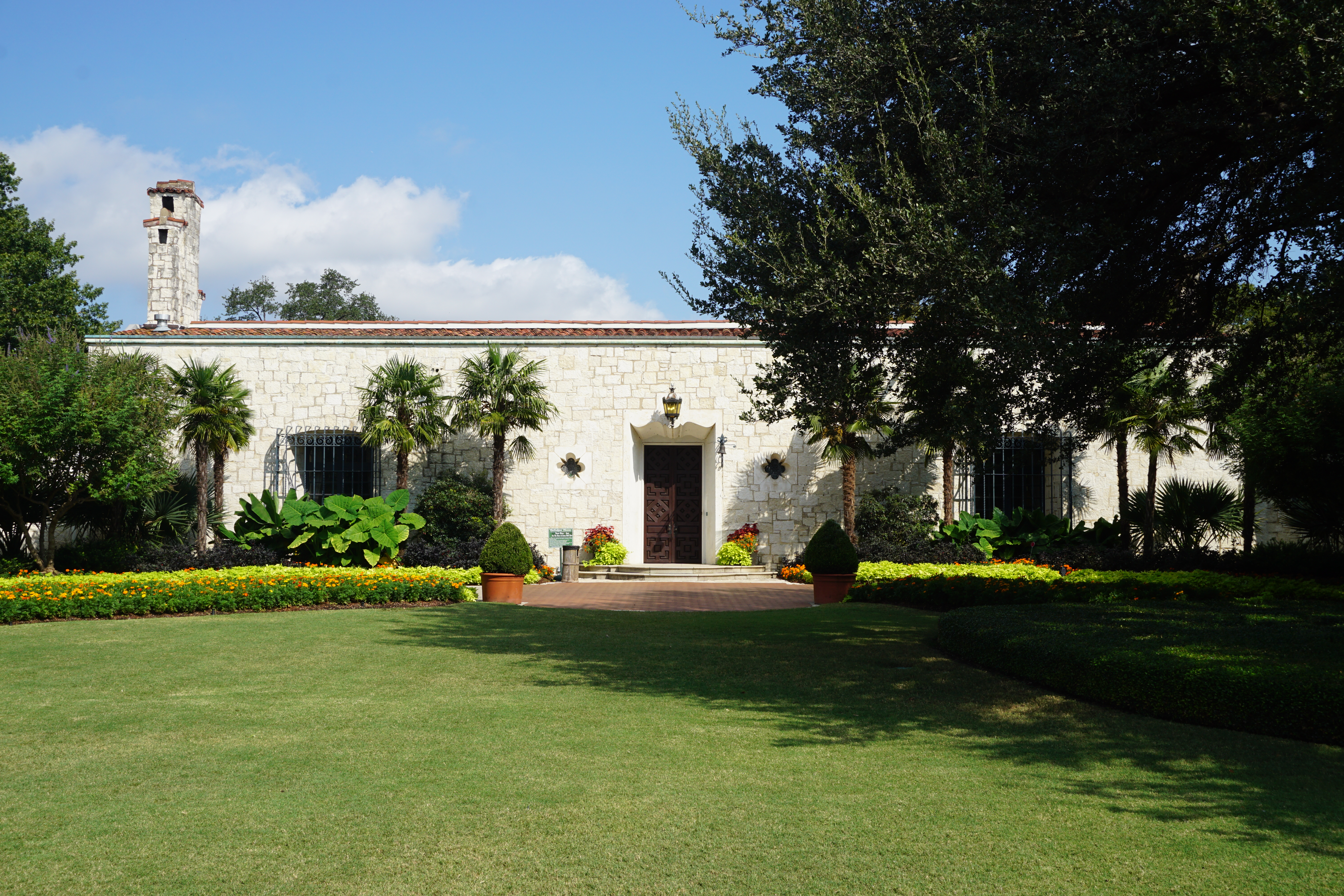
- The DeGolyer House at the Dallas Arboretum and Botanical Garden

- Location within Texas Location within the United States
- Location: 8525 Garland Rd. Dallas, Texas
- Coordinates: 32°49′17″N 96°43′3″W
- Area: 43.057 acres (17.425 ha)
- Built: 1938
- Architect: Denman Scott, Burton Schutt
- Architectural style: Spanish Colonial Revival
- Website: www.dallasarboretum.org
- NRHP reference No.: 78002914
- TSAL No.: 8200000205
- RTHL No.: 6679
- DLMK No.: H/38

Significant dates
- Added to NRHP: December 28, 1978
- Designated TSAL: January 1, 1983
- Designated RTHL: 1991
- Designated DLMK: March 23, 1988

The Dallas Arboretum and Botanical Garden is a 66-acre (27 ha) botanical garden located at 8525 Garland Road in East Dallas, Texas, on the southeastern shore of White Rock Lake.

== History ==
The majority of the grounds were once part of a 44-acre (18 ha) dairy farm, known as "Rancho Encinal", because of the dense live oak population. Geologist Everette Lee DeGolyer and his wife Nell Goodrich DeGolyer, purchased the property and were very involved with the city of Dallas. Built in 1939, the home was designed to look older. At 21,000 square feet, this estate was designed in Spanish Colonial Revival style, featuring thirteen rooms and a 1,750 square foot library.

Since 1976, the DeGolyer Estate has formed a portion of the Dallas Arboretum & Botanical Gardens. The DeGolyer Restaurant/Loggia is located in the DeGolyer House, which overlooks White Rock Lake and A Woman's Garden. Also located on the grounds is an outdoor concert stage, picnic areas, and the 8-acre (3.2 ha) Rory Meyers Children's Adventure Garden with 17 indoor and outdoor galleries. The DeGolyer House is listed on the National Register of Historic Places, as well as the Texas Register of Historic Places.

In 1980, the 22-acre Alex Camp House was purchased and is located next to the DeGolyer estate along White Rock Lake. At 8,500 square feet the Camp House is much smaller, but sits on a hill that overlooks the lake. Completed in 1938, it is a one bedroom deep home styled after Spanish Colonial, English Regency, and Art Deco.

In September 2002, Arboretum facilities were expanded with the opening of the new Visitors Center, named after Dallas developer Trammell Crow.

== About the arboretum ==
Dallas Arboretum opened in 1984 with the mission to create a garden for all members of the public to experience learning, community connection, and beauty through nature. Through the four strategic pillars, their mission has remained the same since opening. Environment makes up the first pillar, showcasing the horticultural beauty through their plant collection, spaces, and design. Excellence is number 2, by modernizing infrastructure and creating financial sustainability. Third is engagement, bringing the community in through accessibility, partnerships, and marketing. Lastly is experience, by offering lasting memories, discoveries, and wonder.

The arboretum is a staple in Dallas, having a place among the top arboretums globally and a number of honors. As the community grows and attendees continue to visit, there have been many improvements to sustainable practices. In 2012, a charitable donation of 6 solar-powered trams was made by Green Mountain Energy. This gave the arboretum a way to transport visitors that reflected their commitment to renewable energy, while giving riders the opportunity to learn about sustainability. By 2016, they reached just over one million visitors and it has steadily grown since then. In addition to regular visits, they also provide sustainable learning opportunities for outreach and fieldtrip groups, after-school programs, homeschool programs, learning workshops, summer camps, and classes for Pre-K to high school seniors. They also have Continuing Professional Education classes for teachers.

== Named gardens ==
Gardens around the arboretum are named, aiding employees to organize collections, create distinct themed areas, and provide public engagement. Currently, there are 19 named gardens.

=== The Trammell Crow Visitor Education Pavilion and Entry Plaza ===
Built with native Texas limestone and wood and copper sheathing, the structure serves as the gateway to the gardens. The Scott K. Ginsburg Family Plaza and Junkins Fountain is located at the entrance.

=== Margaret Elisabeth Jonsson Color Garden ===
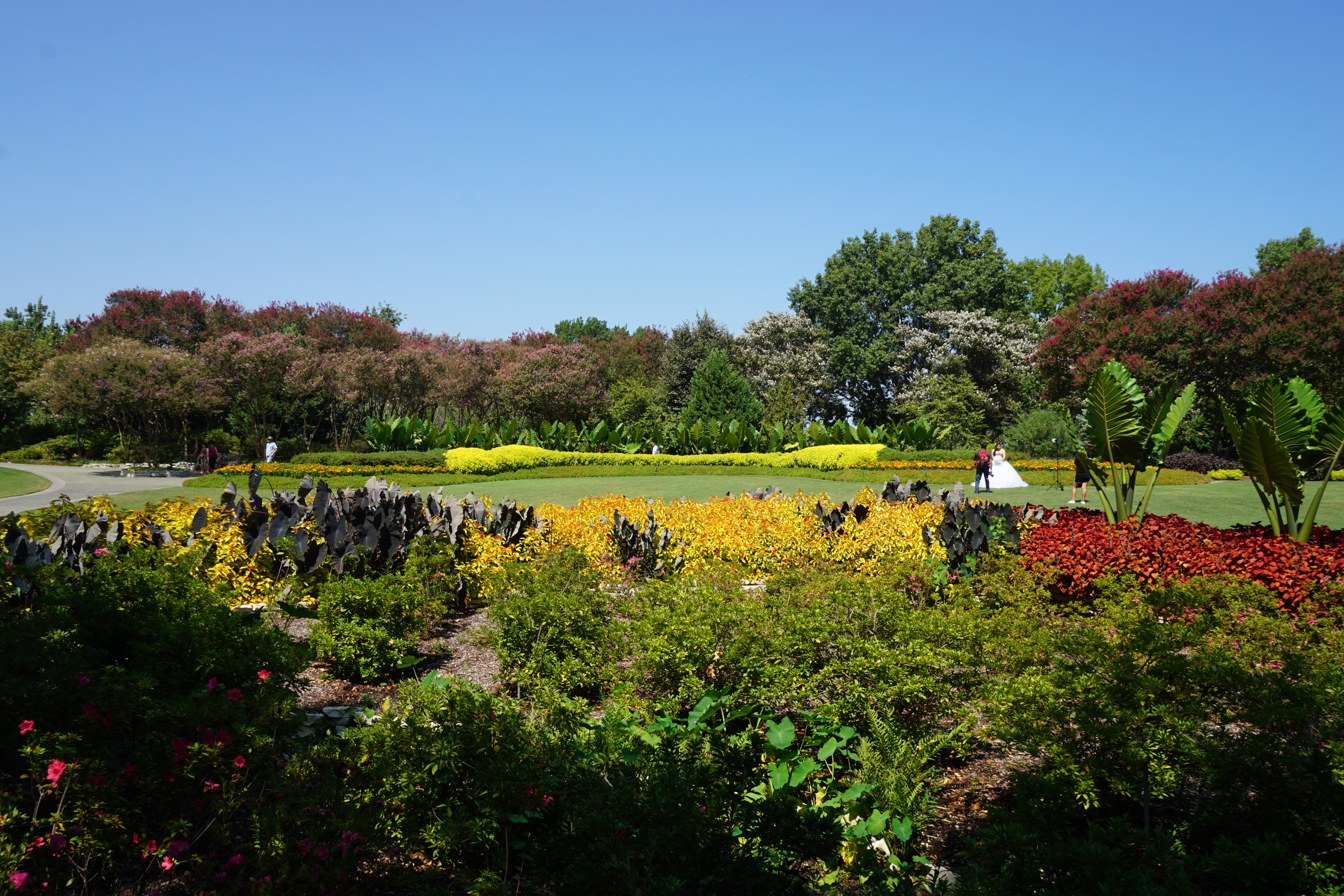
Jonsson Color Garden

The Margaret Elisabeth Jonsson Color Garden spans 6.5 acres (2.6 ha) and is a horticultural attraction designed by Naud Burnett II. The garden features seasonal flowers and plants arranged in various beds, creating a visually stunning display. Additionally, visitors can explore the Waterwise display, donated by Region IV of the Texas Nursery and Landscape Association, which provides home gardeners with valuable resources on how to manage a low-water landscape. The Palmer Fern Dell, another feature of the garden, contains a large collection of ferns, camellias, azaleas, and other perennials and shrubs, making it a popular spot among visitors.

=== A Woman's Garden ===
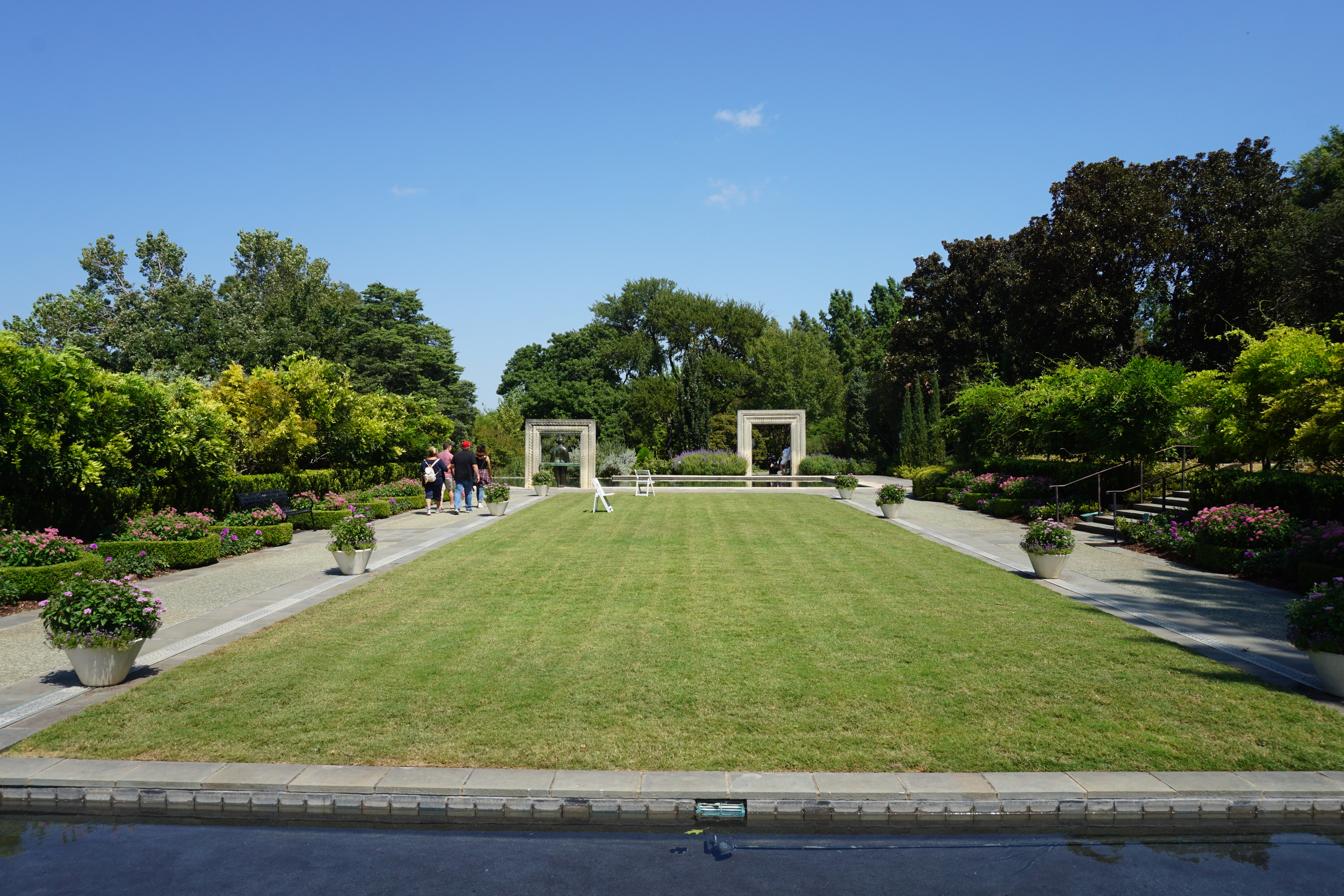
A Woman's Garden

A Woman's Garden is a gift from the Women's Council of Dallas. The first phase of this 1.8-acre (0.73 ha) formal garden was designed in 1997 by landscape architect Morgan Wheelock. A Woman's Garden is composed of several smaller outdoor garden "rooms" and terraced walkways, including the Pecan Parterre and the Poetry Garden, which features a sunken garden of roses.

The second phase of development opened to the public in the spring of 2006 and was designed by Dallas landscape architect Warren Johnson. It has a native Texas limestone bridge, a 140-foot hanging garden, and a wellspring surrounded by Dawn Redwoods. The purpose of designing these two gardens was to celebrate the strength, courage, creativity and nurturing demeanor of women.

=== The Nancy Rutchik Red Maple Rill ===
This two-acre (0.81 ha) garden includes a collection of over 80 varieties of signature Japanese Maples planted along the stream.

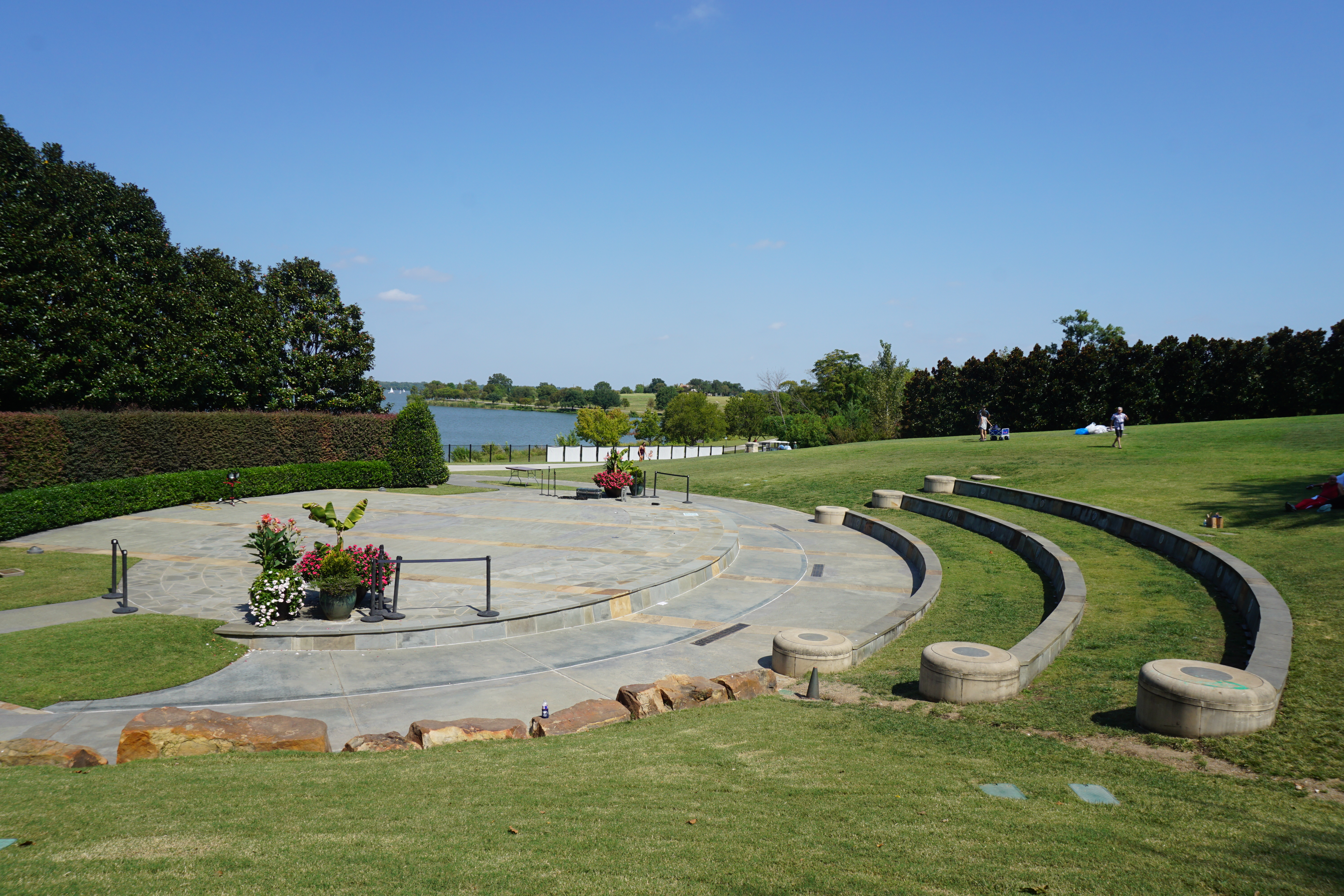
Martin Rutchik Concert Stage & Lawn

The rill opened in the fall of 2011 and was designed by Rowland Jackson, with construction services provided by The Beck Group. Key design elements include an entry off the Paseo de Flores and a gathering plaza that overlooks a re-circulating creek and various waterfalls. The area also includes a series of paved walkways and a stone bridge connecting the Martin Rutchik Concert Stage to the Magnolia Allee. A large weeping Japanese maple, nearly 100 years old, is in the center of the garden.

=== The Lyda Bunker Hunt Paseo de Flores ===
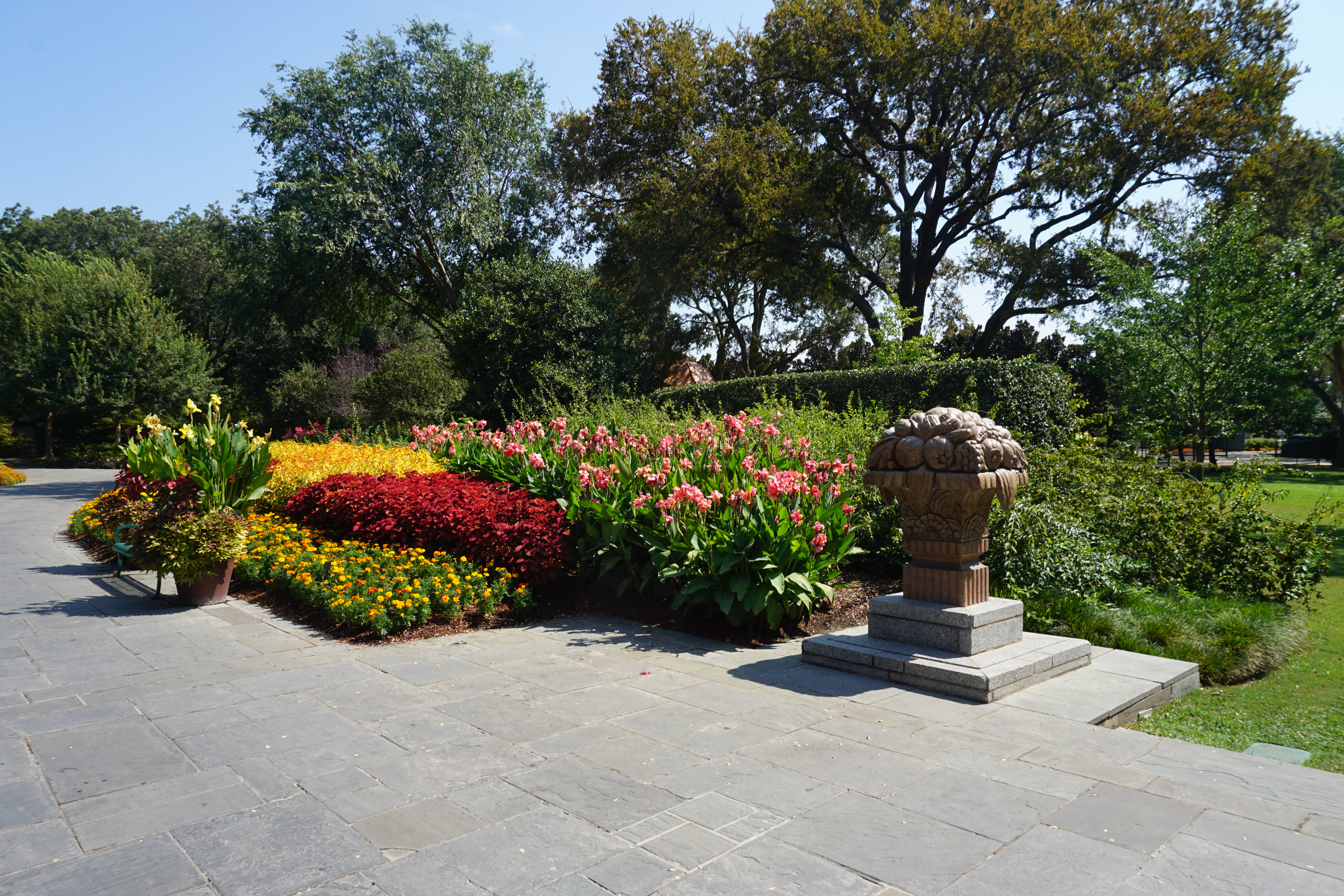
Paseo de Flores

Commonly referred to as The Paseo, this pathway serves as the central walkway of the Dallas Arboretum and Botanical Garden.

Designed by Luis Santana, the path begins at the Trammell Crow Visitor Education Pavilion and concludes near Fogelson Fountain, which was donated by the late Greer Garson in memory of her husband, Buddy.

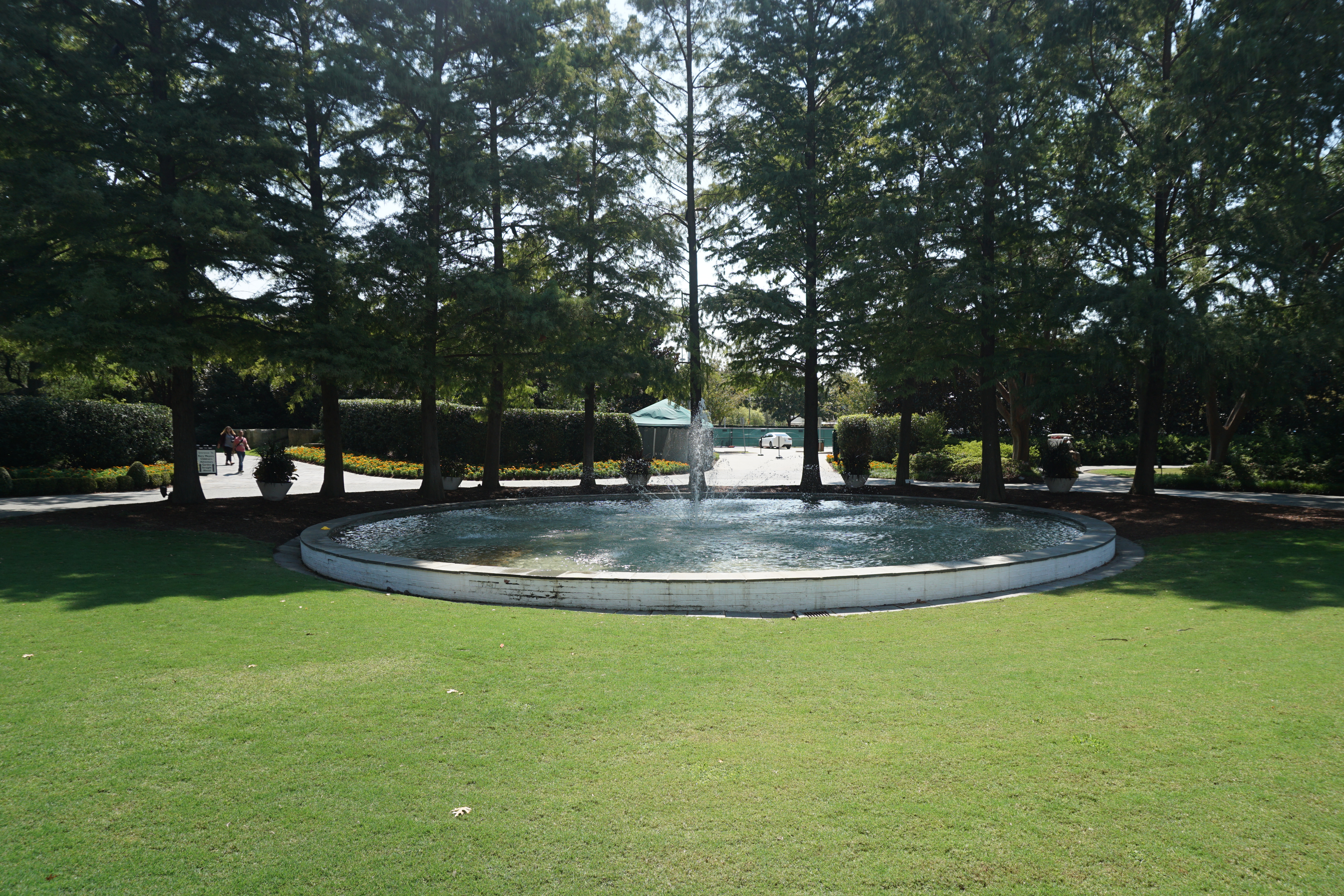
Fogelson Fountain

=== Boswell Family Garden ===
A stacked stone wall serves as the backbone of this garden, alongside a range of rose varieties. Donated in 2004 by George Boswell and designed by landscape architect Warren Johnson of Fallcreek Gardens, The Boswell Family Garden comprises the area north of the McCasland Sunken Garden and is surrounded by the Gazebo, Octagonal Fountain, and Magnolia Allee. An overlook offers a view of White Rock Lake and the surrounding gardens.

=== McCasland Sunken Garden ===
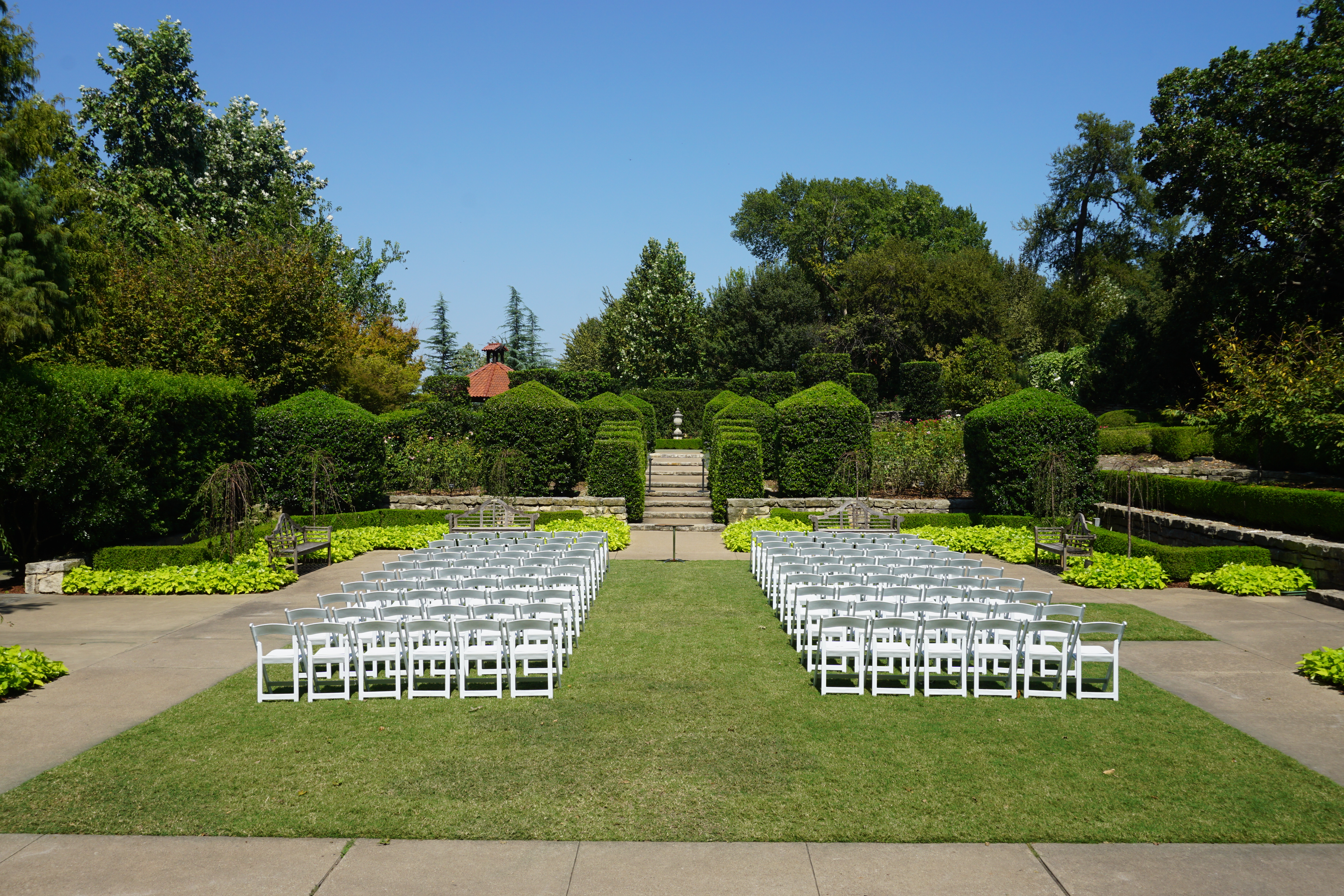
McCasland Sunken Garden

Tom and Phyllis McCasland's 2006 contribution, the McCasland Sunken Garden, was designed by Warren Johnson. It is a renovation and upgrade of the original Sunken Garden. The central aisle, lined with Italian jardinières, leads down a series of steps toward a grass court surrounded by seasonal plantings.

=== The Eugenia Leftwich Palmer Fern Dell ===
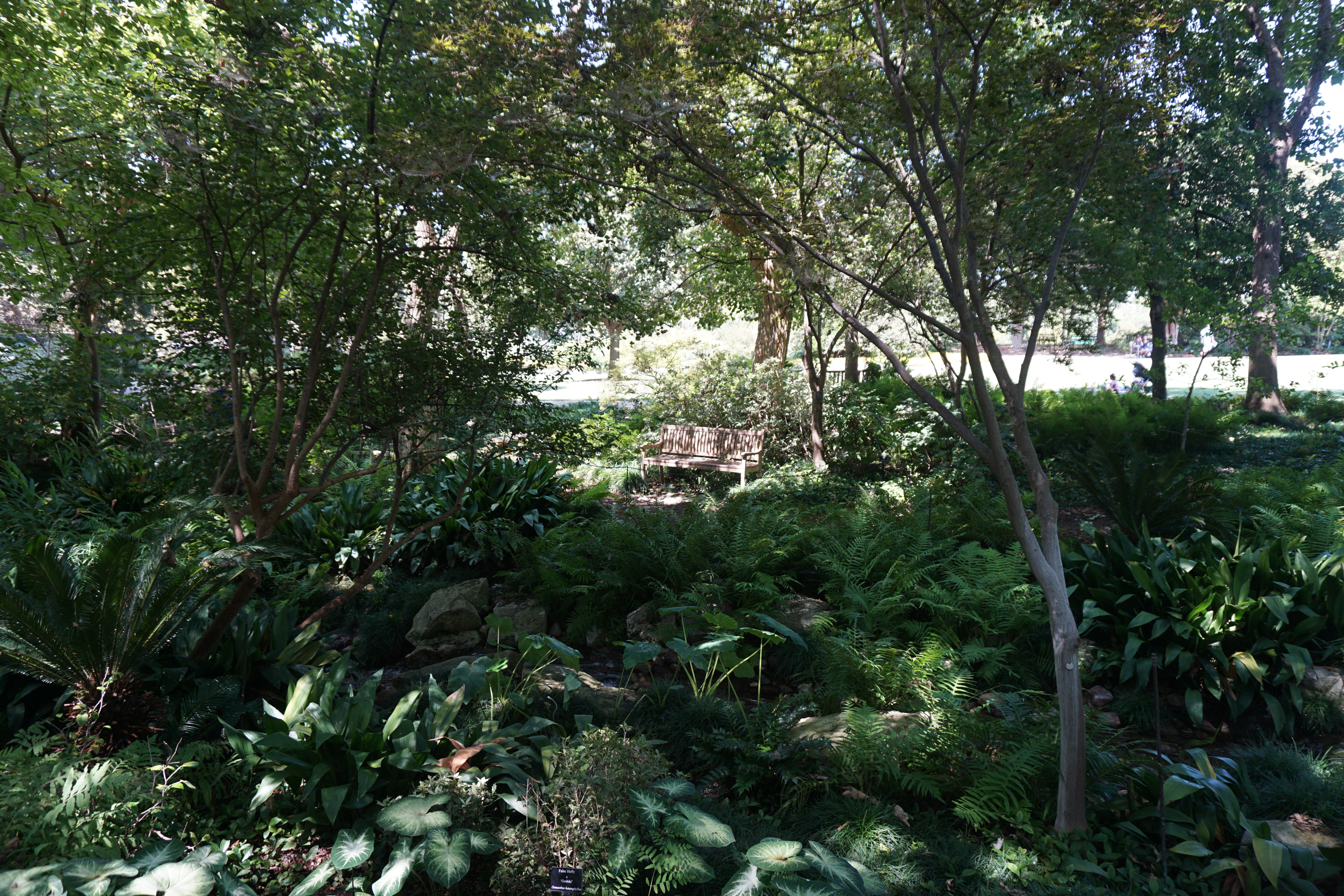
Palmer Fern Dell

The Palmer Fern Dell, designed by Naud Burnett II, is located within the Jonsson Color Garden. Over 90 varieties of ferns, camellias, azaleas and mature trees border a brook, which winds throughout this mini garden.

=== The Nancy Clements Seay Magnolia Glade ===
The Magnolia Glade features a waterway and lily pond amid a collection of flowers. Along with her husband Austin, Pauline Neuhoff dedicated this quiet garden to honor her mother. Designed by landscape architect Warren Hill Johnson, the glade takes on different colors and textures throughout the year. Framed by the 45-foot flowers of the Dallas Arboretum's Magnolia Allee, the glade is enclosed by ‘Teddy Bear’ southern magnolias, as well as butterfly Japanese Maples, large white flowering camellias, and loquats.

=== Nancy's Garden ===
Nancy's Garden is planted with pink crape myrtles and azaleas, and is filled seasonally with pastel annual color. Located within the DeGolyer Gardens, this space was originally Nell DeGolyer's personal garden. In 1992, the garden was renovated and dedicated to the children of Nancy Dillard Lyon. The Bill Dillard Family renovated the plantings and lighting of the area, which included benches as well as the sculpture Thank Heaven for Little Girls by Gary Price.

=== Crape Myrtle Allee ===
Crape myrtle trees enclose a stone walkway to create the garden. This natural tunnel leads visitors to the "toad corners" water feature, with two polliwog basins at the Paseo entry. Opened to the public in 1994, Crape Myrtle Allee was originally funded by the Communities Foundation. Dedicated to John and Thelma Black by their daughter Peggy Braecklein, the Allee features a lane of crape myrtle trees, which replaced the original trees planted by the DeGolyers. Paved with Pennsylvania bluestone, the Allee runs from the Paseo to Toad Corners.

=== Chandler Lindsley Shadow Garden ===
The Chandler Lindsley Shadow Garden is filled with azalea bordered pathways, providing color during the spring. A row of magnolias provides a backdrop for the garden.

=== Pecan Grove ===
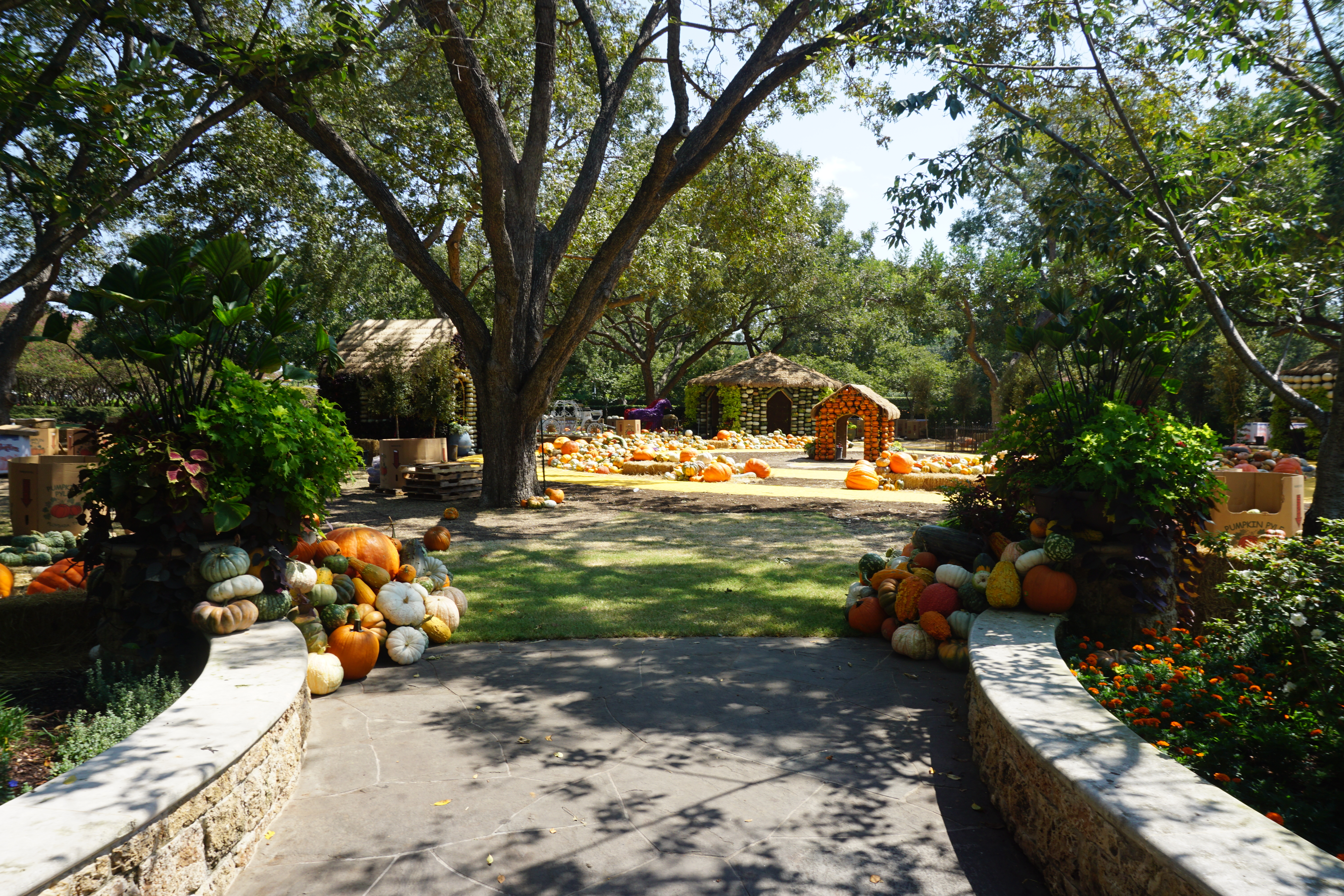
Pumpkin Village in Pecan Grove

Pecan Grove serves as the centerpiece of the festival, Autumn at the Arboretum. In spring, over 100 Japanese Cherry Trees surround the Pecan Grove. In fall, over 50,000 pumpkins, gourds and squash come together to form the Pumpkin Village at the Arboretum.

=== The Martha Brooks Camellia Garden ===
Designed by Warren Johnson and opened in January 2000, the Camellia Garden is located along the Paseo de Flores and features 200 camellias and over 30 different cultivars. The Martha Brooks Camellia Garden was funded by the employees of Central and South West Corporation and was dedicated to the wife of retired CEO Dick Brooks.

=== DeGolyer Gardens ===
The 21,000-square-foot home of Mr. and Mrs. DeGolyer serves as the centerpiece to this garden. Landscape architects Arthur and Marie Berger designed the 4.5-acre (1.8 ha) DeGolyer Gardens for the DeGolyer family in 1940. Many of the original garden features remain, including the Magnolia Allee, the Sunken Garden and the Octagonal Fountain. In 2012, the existing entry landscape was replaced with a new design featuring tropical plants and palms.

=== Lay Family Garden ===
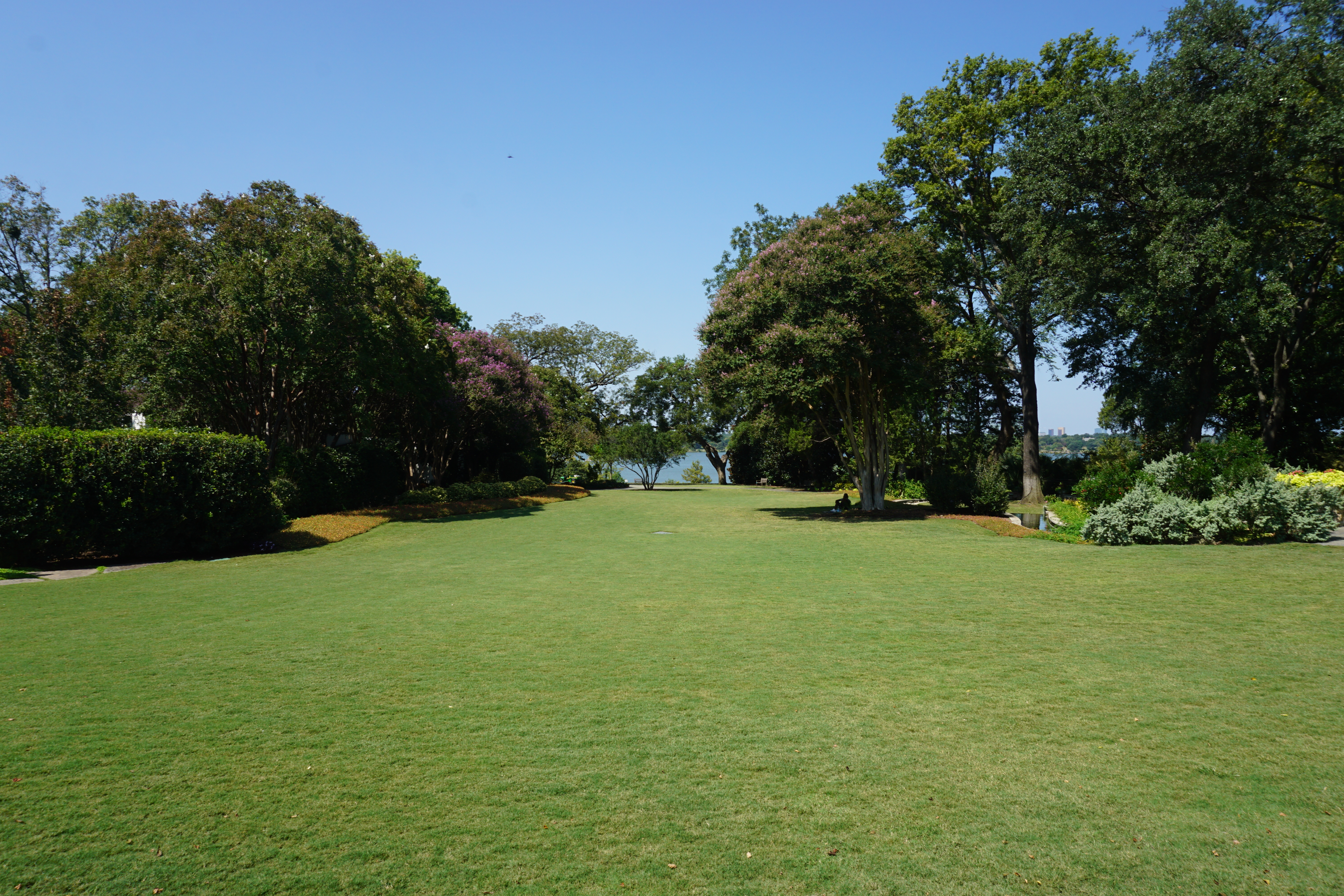
Lay Family Garden

The Lay Family Garden (formally known as the Lay Ornamental Garden) is a 2.2-acre (0.89 ha) garden filled with hundreds of perennials and woody plants. A garden at the south end of the property, it is a reinterpretation of the Lay Ornamental Garden, a gift from the family of Mimi Lay Hodges and Herman Lay. The Lay Family Garden was named for Herman Lay, co-founder of Frito-Lay.

=== Rose Mary Haggar Rose Garden ===
Located within the DeGolyer Gardens, this pocket rose garden contains over 200 Hybrid Tea Roses of 16 different varieties.

=== The Trial Gardens ===
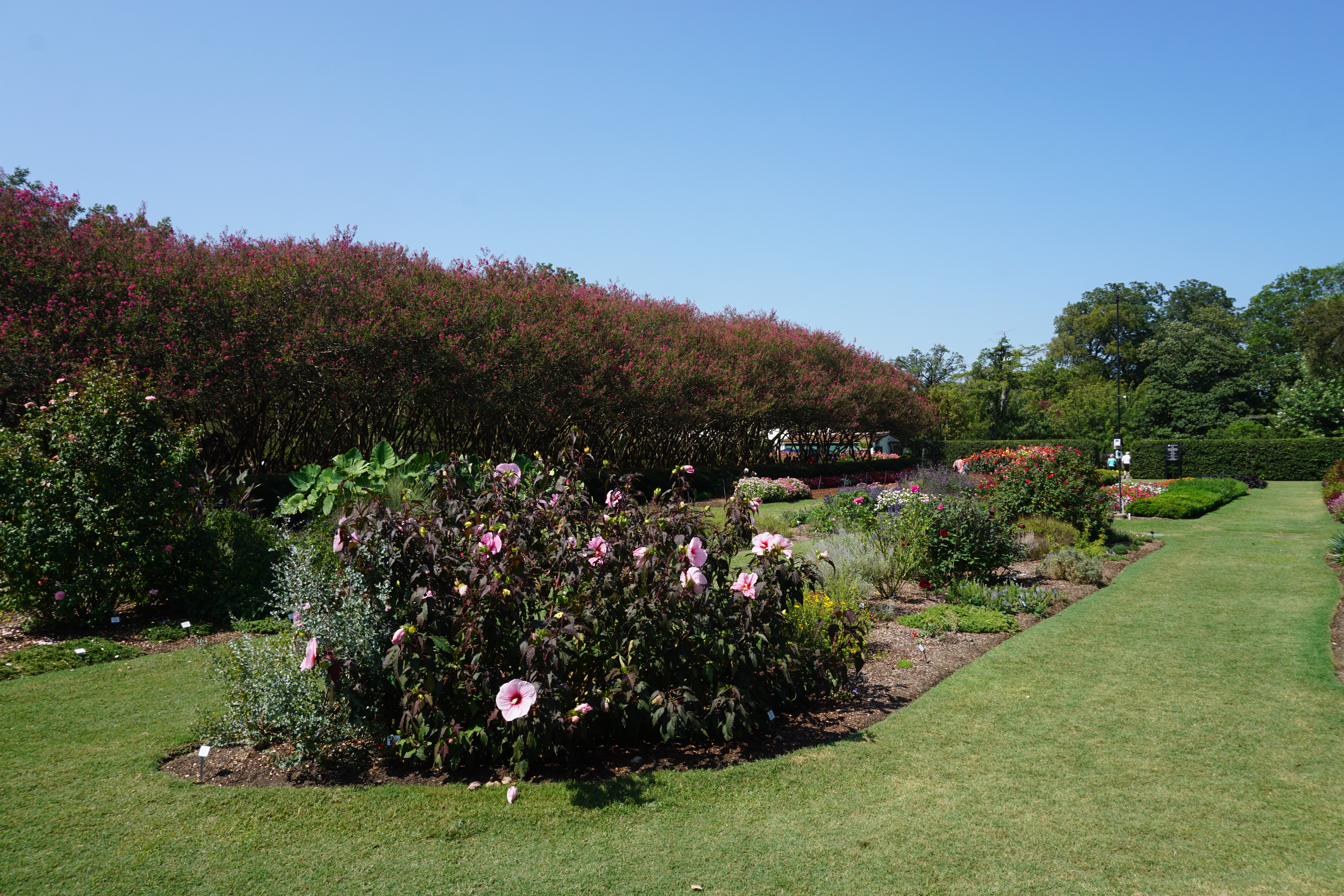
Trial Gardens

In 2002, the Dallas Arboretum became the 31st "All-America Selections Trial Garden". The Trial Gardens opened to the public in March 2003. The Trial Gardens at the Dallas Arboretum were established to expand research efforts and provide the public with information. The focus of the trial program is to grow and evaluate many different plants in the diverse, occasionally extreme, North Central Texas Climate. Soil is considered unfavorable here, being heavy clay with high pH levels between 8.5 and 9.5. However, soil in the test gardens is heavily amended with compost and expanded shale. Information generated from the trials is provided to commercial plant producers, retailers, and home gardeners. Between 3,000 and 5,000 plants are trialed yearly from over 150 plant breeding companies.

=== The Rory Meyers Children's Adventure Garden ===
The Rory Meyers Children's Adventure Garden was designed to connect children with nature and promote environmental awareness. Named after Rory Myers, who was on the arboretum board and had a seat on the committee. Focused on education, this is an area for children to learn about life and Earth sciences. With 17 interactive galleries, there is a strong sense of preserving ecosystems and a commitment to teaching all ages. Within the adventure garden is the Incredible Edible Garden, teaching children about where food comes from and how to care for various fruits, herbs, and vegetables. Throughout the adventure garden, the main natural resource is water. It plays a part in the low-impact design by being built on a slope towards White Rock Lake, filling a cistern that catches rainwater which is then used for irrigation in the arboretum. Another garden exhibit, called Pure Energy, is used to teach visitors about alternative energy such as solar power, hydroelectric, and wind. The Children's Garden is funded with support from the City of Dallas, private, and corporate donors.

=== Gallery ===
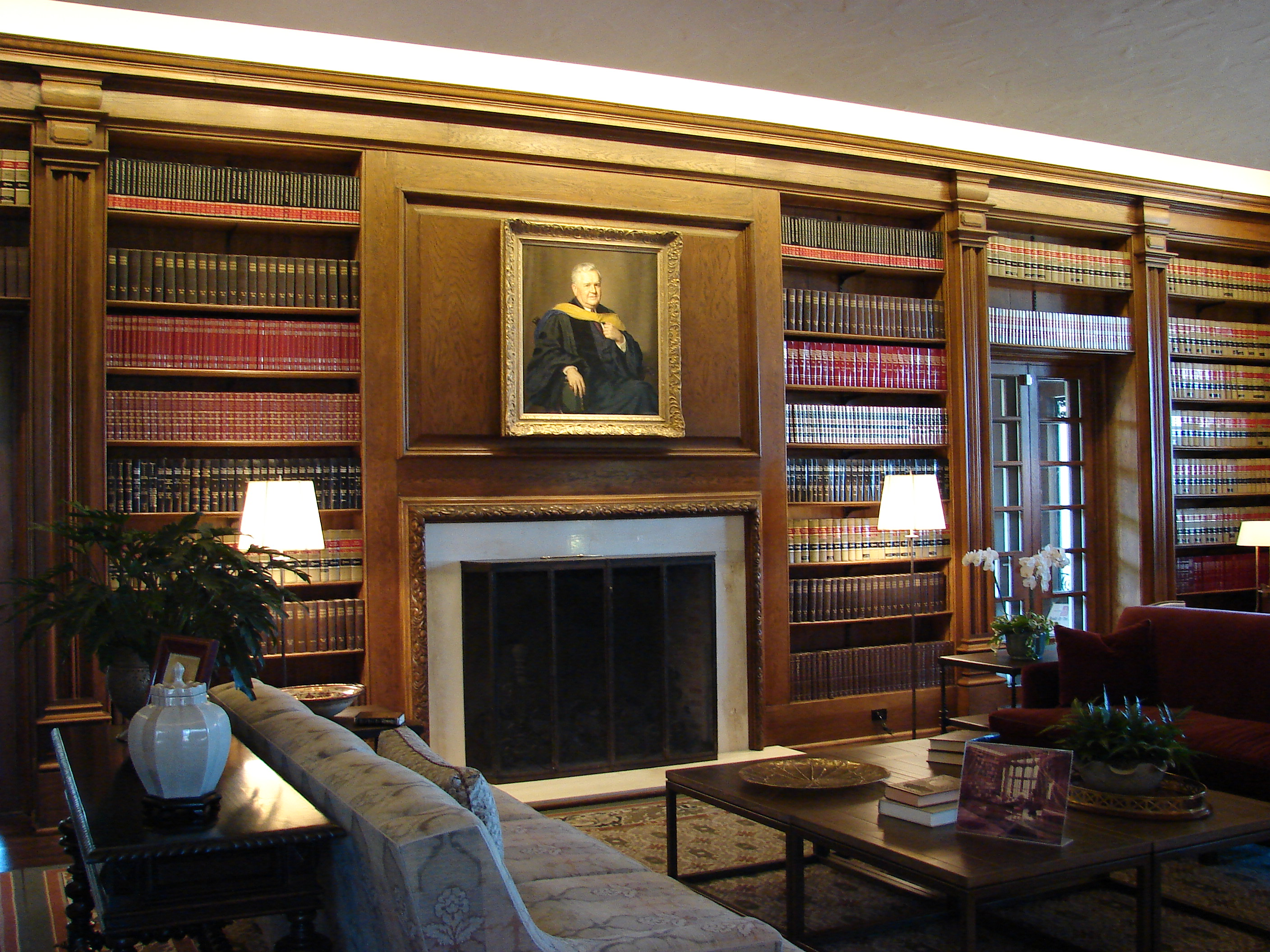
Library in the DeGolyer House.

Topiary in a garden.

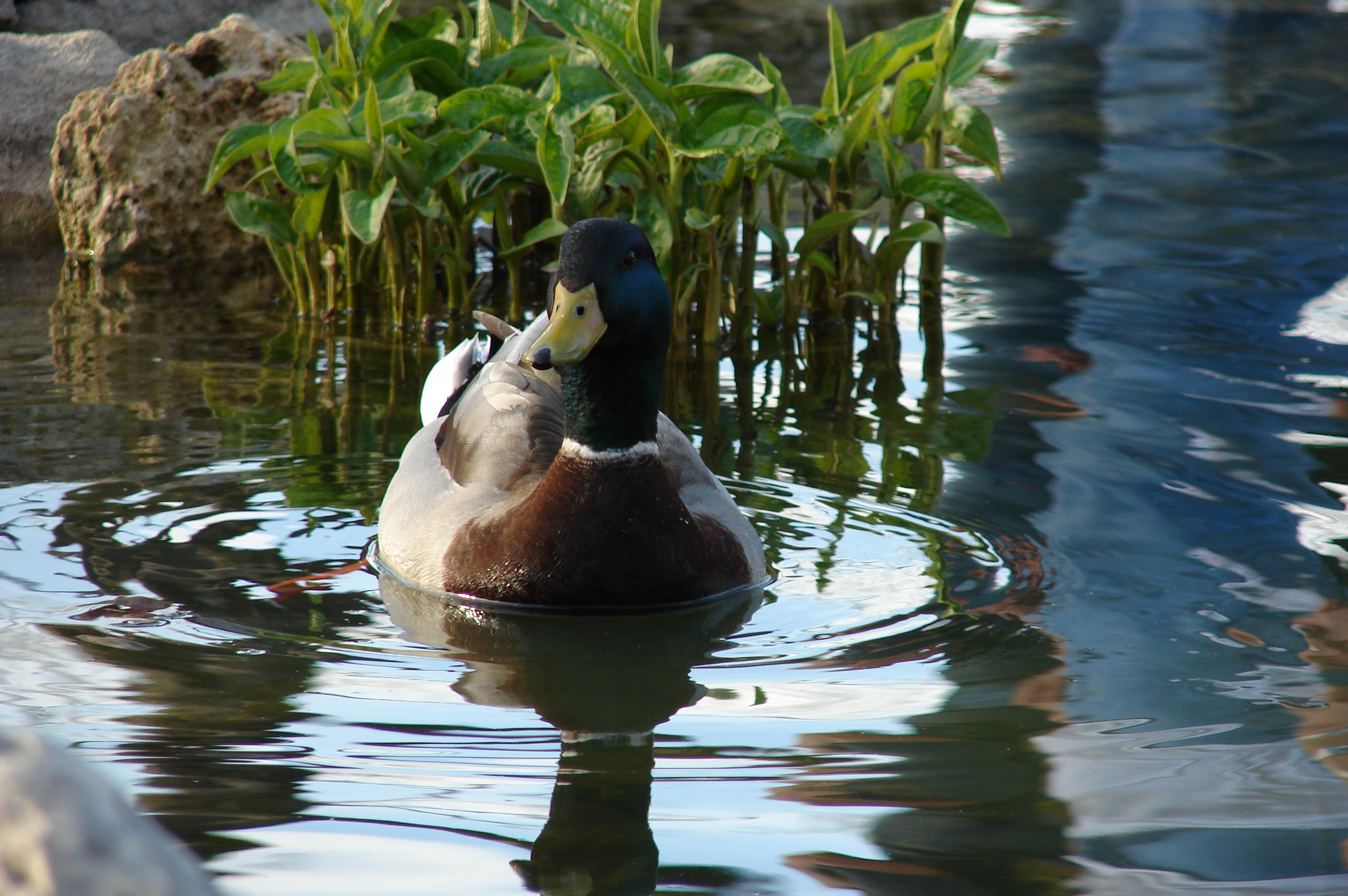
A mallard duck in one of the ponds.

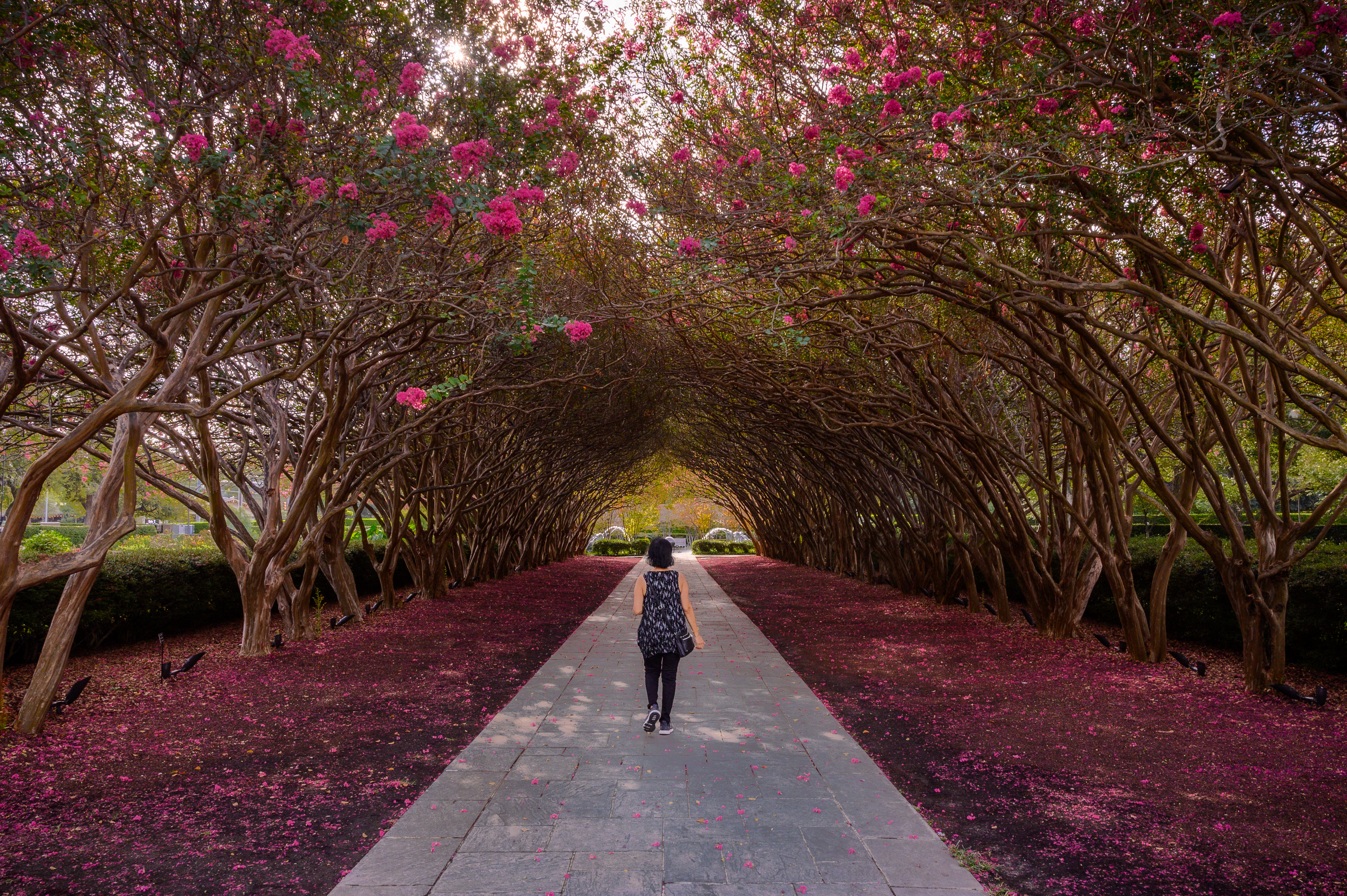
Crepe Myrtles ipromote

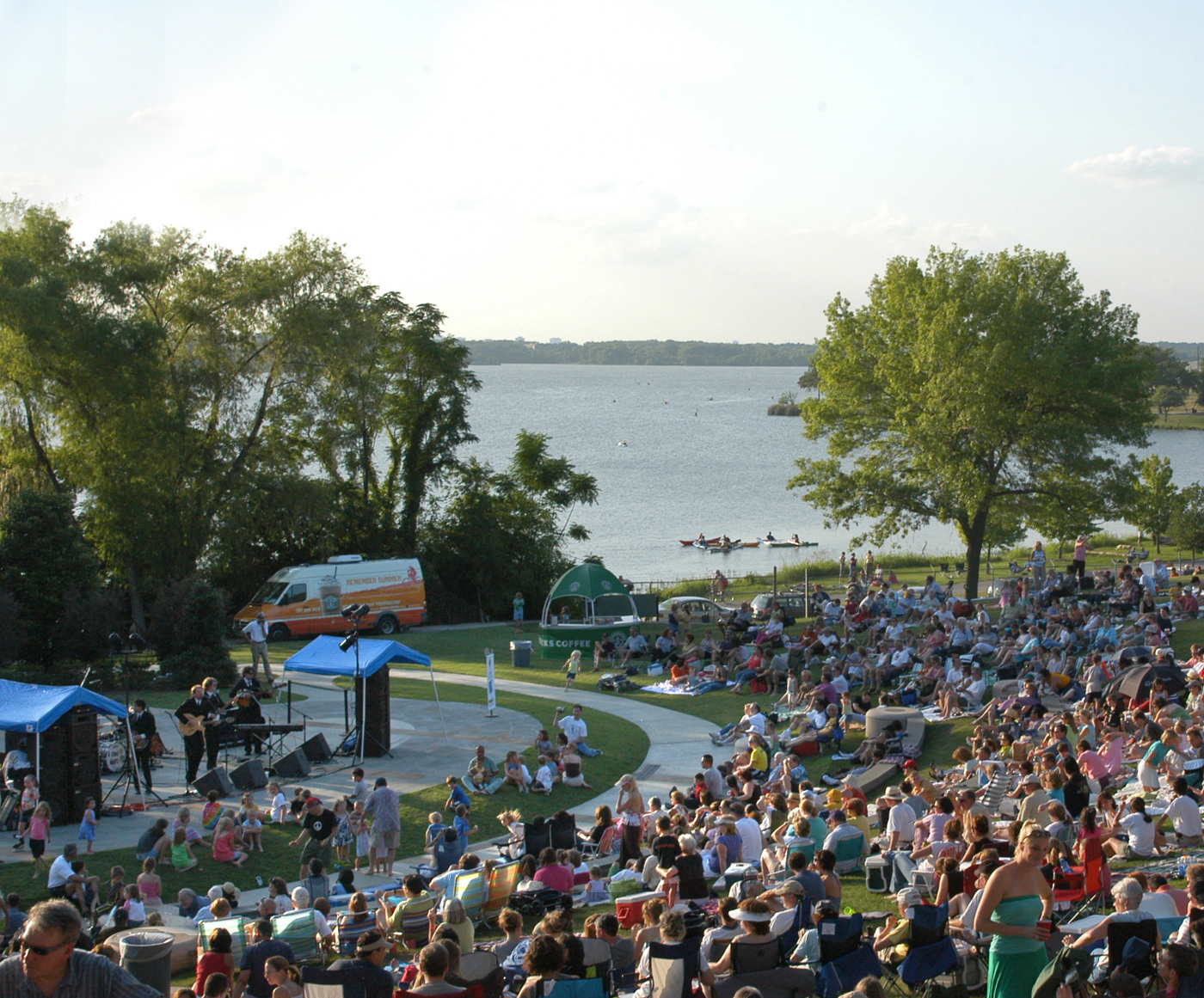
One of the many events held at the arboretum.

== See also ==
- List of botanical gardens in the United States
- National Register of Historic Places listings in Dallas County, Texas
- Recorded Texas Historic Landmarks in Dallas County
- List of Dallas Landmarks
