= White Rock Lake =

- Location within Texas Location within the United States
- Location: Dallas, Texas, United States
- Coordinates: 32°48′54″N 96°43′31″W
- Type: reservoir, recreation
- Primary inflows: White Rock Creek
- Primary outflows: White Rock Creek
- Basin countries: United States
- Surface area: 1,254 acres (507 ha)
- Max. depth: 18 ft 0 in (5.49 m)
- Water volume: 18,160 acre⋅ft (0.02240 km^{3})
- Surface elevation: 458.1 ft (139.6 m)
- Settlements: Dallas

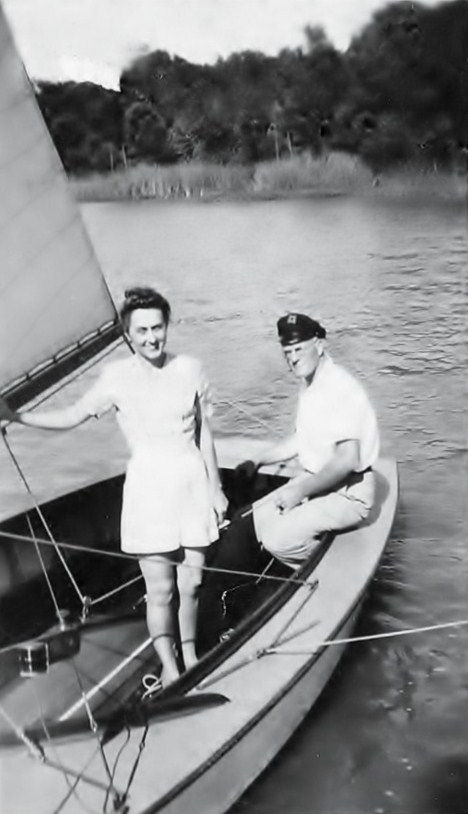
James Bowen and his wife Julia, sailing on White Rock Lake in the summer of 1940. Mr. Bowen was an avid member of the Corinthian Sailing Club in the late 1930s and early 1940s. He designed and built several fast and beautiful sailboats in the garage of his home located on Ross Avenue in Dallas TX. He built the boats specifically for club sponsored racing events on White Rock Lake.

White Rock Lake is a reservoir located in northeast Dallas, Texas, United States. The lake was formed by damming White Rock Creek, which today widens into the lake before continuing south out of the spillway and emptying into the Trinity River. The lake covers 1,254 acres (5.07 km^{2}) in the east Dallas community.

== History ==
Before it was a lake, White Rock Lake was a collection of farms owned by the Daniel and Cox families. The first record of the Daniel family farm is in the Family Bible of Thomas Walker Daniel. He and his wife Frances Herndon Daniel seem to have moved to the White Rock area in the late 1830s and early 1840s. Daniel's son had a good friend during the civil war named Cox. When the war was over, the Cox family moved to land adjacent to the Daniel family. Together they had a joint family cemetery called the Daniel-Cox Cemetery. Other pioneer families such as the Humbards, the Glovers, Lavenders, McCommases, Coxes and Donagheys jointly maintained the cemetery.

Construction on White Rock Lake began in 1910 in response to a water shortage in Dallas. After the lake was completed in 1911, residential construction around the lake increased, and in the early 1930s the Dallas Park Board, with the help of the Civilian Conservation Corps (CCC), began developing the lakeshores into a municipal park. The White Rock CCC Camp was established at Winfrey Point and included eight barracks buildings. For several years, the men of the CCC deepened and widened the lake, built numerous limestone rock buildings, and made recreation improvements to the park.

At the outbreak of WWII, the U.S. Army used the CCC camp as induction point for new recruits. In 1943 the government used the barracks at Winfrey Point to house 403 German prisoners-of-war who had served in Rommel's Afrika Corps.

The growing population of Dallas and a drought increased the demand for water, and on September 1, 1952, the beaches of White Rock saw their last swimmers in order to maintain a sanitary water supply.

By 1992 White Rock Lake Park was a center of recreational activity for central Dallas, providing picnic areas and bicycle and jogging paths.

All that is left of the Daniel and Cox farms is the old "Daniel-Cox family cemetery." The Daniel family fell upon hard times and when the cemetery was renovated, the Cox family contributed funds to renovate the cemetery so the current sign reads "Cox Cemetery".

== White Rock Dam ==
White Rock Dam was completed in 1911 as an earthen dam with a height of 47 feet, a length of 2550 feet at its crest, for storm water control and municipal water supply. With a maximum storage capacity of 39,400 acre-feet, the facility is owned and operated by the City of Dallas.

== Recreation ==
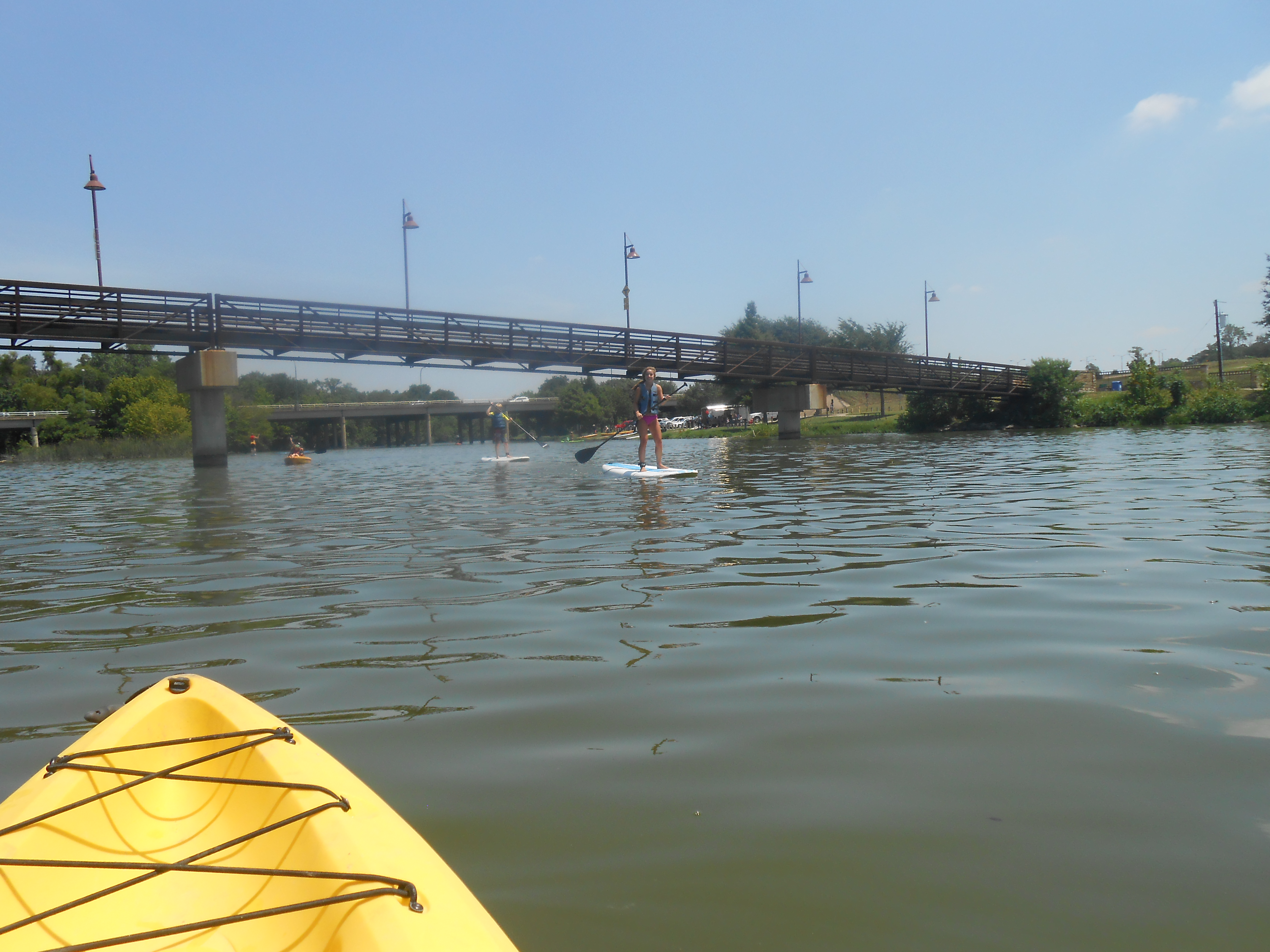
Canoeing and paddle boarding on White Rock Lake, TX, July 2014

After its function primarily as a water source was supplanted, White Rock Lake continued to serve as a recreational lake for both City of Dallas and suburban residents. From its earliest days, area residents wanting to get away from home constructed cabins on leased property along its shoreline. The Bonnie Barge, for example, was operated on the lake by Garland resident John H. Williams, Sr. from 1946 to 1956.

White Rock offers a number of activities, but one it has become most notable for is rowing. They have a historical boathouse and dock where boats are launched off of almost every day by rowers of all ages. There are also sometimes races that people watch from their sail boats or around the lake.

Although originally permitted, swimming was banned in September 1952 and a ban on motorized boats followed in 1958. Current recreational activities on the lake include sailing, kayaking, canoeing and standup paddleboarding, available by rental.

The lake is surrounded by White Rock Lake Park, which features a 9.33 miles (15.02 km) trail for hiking, running and bicycling, the Bath House Cultural Center and the Dallas Arboretum and Botanical Garden. There are several fishing piers and sailing is permitted.

The Bath House once served as a boathouse for several crew teams, including SMU. White Rock Boathouse (established in 1930) was originally used for motor boats, but was later adapted to house sculling boats. The Boathouse later went on to lease the old Filter Building and holding tanks from the former purification facility and converted them into what may be the largest boathouse worldwide.

== Sailing ==
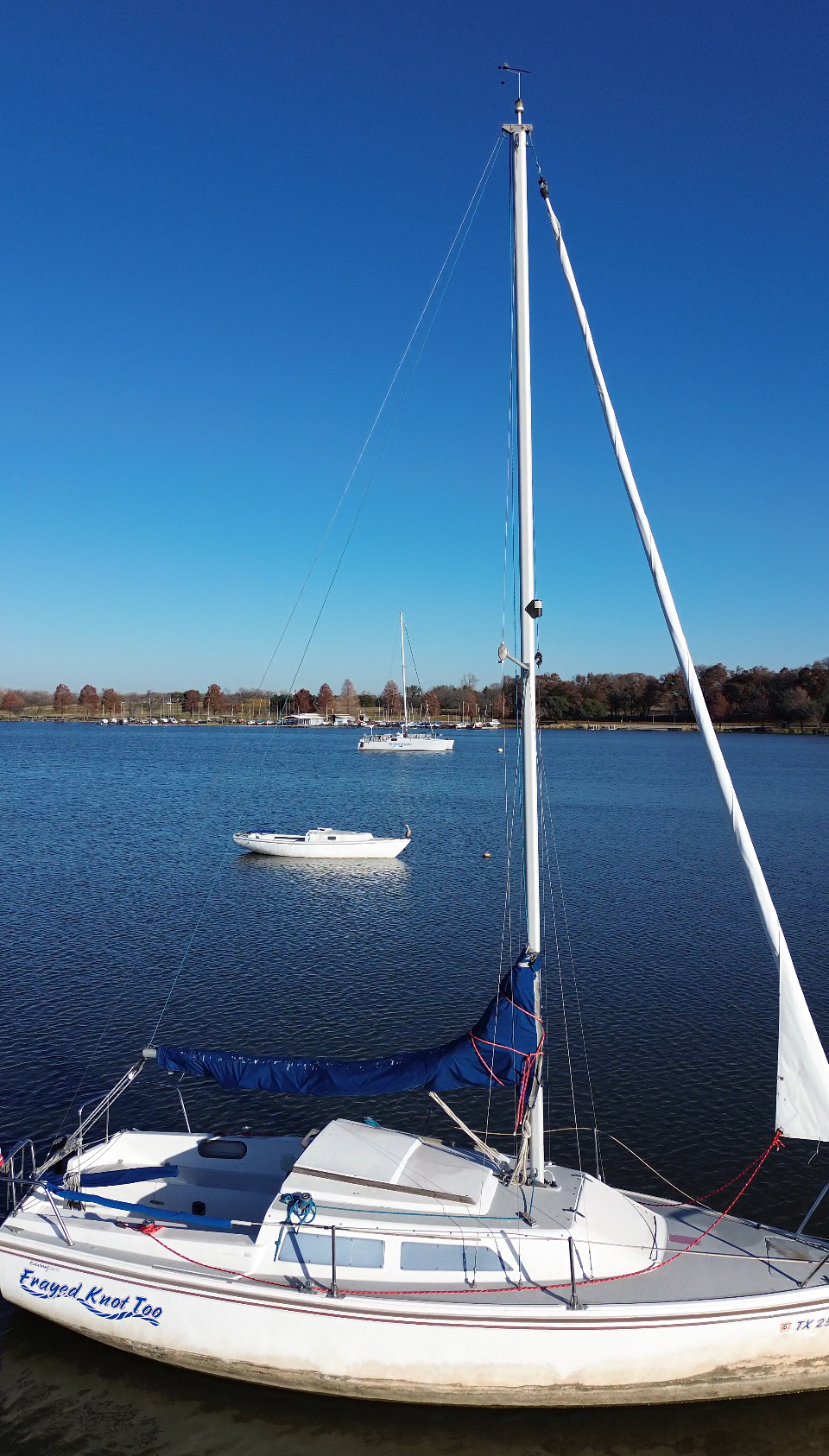
Sailboats on White Rock Lake 2024

The Corinthian Sailing Club was chartered in 1939 to promote the sport of sailing and sailboat racing in the Dallas area. The club focuses on racing with well attended Saturday and Sunday afternoon races, Wednesday evening "fun" races, club sponsored regattas held year round, and several major annual regattas. The club is nationally known for its excellent sailors and fine race management. CSC, located on beautiful White Rock Lake in Dallas, also sponsors many social activities, teaches adult sailing and supports an active juniors program.

The White Rock Boat Club was formed in 1961 as the brainchild of three members of the Corinthian Sailing Club. CSC was having a problem with tracking davit ownership and the price of davits escalated due to demand since the club had no control over prices. Two of the founders, the Oetkings, had also developed a fine catamaran called the Hellcat and had gone into production with growing sales, but they couldn't find davits at CSC. WRBC was constructed not only to supply reasonably priced davits, but to help sell Hellcats. The club sold davits to help pay for the construction of the club, with the provision that the club could buy the davit back if the owner left the club. The club has exercised this right and now owns and leases most of its davits. The club was constructed with a few differences from its present configuration as can be seen in the 1968 photo above. In order to promote organized class sailing, WRBC at one time limited the type of boats kept at the club to racing classes. In the 1970s, the following classes of sailboats were eligible for membership: Butterfly, Coronado 15, Flying Scot, Harpoon, Lido, Lone Star 13, MC Scow, M16 Scow, M20 Scow and Rebel. The club remains active on the lake today.

White Rock Lake is also home to the Southern Methodist University Sailing Club which uses the lake primarily as the team's practice water

=== White Rock Marathon ===
Many events are held at White Rock Lake, including the White Rock Marathon, which, for part of the course, runs around the lake. The White Rock Marathon is recognized as a top 10 marathon within the United States, and serves as a Boston Marathon qualifier. The primary beneficiary of the marathon is Texas Scottish Rite Hospital for Children.

== Flora ==
Dozens of varieties of trees, and more than 100 grass and plant species exist in the park. Known as a jewel in the crown of the Dallas Park System, it is visited by over 1 million visitors a year.

Today, the park has an ecosystem that includes grasses, trees, flowers and wildlife that are indigenous to the North Texas area. Grasslands include black prairie grasses as well as more invasive species like Queen Anne's Lace.

Wildflowers are planted in un-mowed areas and bloom in late spring. Photos can be taken especially off the East Lawther Trail and close to Mockingbird Lane.

== Fauna ==
Dozens of species of birds call White Rock Lake home. The ecosystem of the waterfront makes it a perfect nesting place for small and large water birds including herons, egrets, geese, ducks, and pelicans, along with woodland birds such as owls, hawks and eagles. Some feral bird species may also be identified, including monk parakeets that nest in nearby electrical substations and feed off of trees by the trail. It is unknown exactly how these parakeets, native to South America, first established themselves in the area.

The wildlife at White Rock Lake is thriving. From squirrels and beavers to larger animals which are white-tailed deer, raccoons, red foxes, bobcats, wild boars, river otters, minks, nutrias, opossums, skunks and coyotes. White Rock is home to many animals that keep this park in balance. Many of these land animals can be spotted near the Old Fish Hatchery.

The lake contains catfish, sunfish, crappie, carp, gar, and bass. A handful of reports in the early 1990s claim that hagfish had been spotted in White Rock Lake as well.

Largemouth bass are found around structures like the reed beds, mouths of creeks, and up Dickson Branch.

== Folklore ==
A well-known Dallas urban legend is the story of the Lady of White Rock Lake. White Rock Lake Park is reported to be haunted by the ghost of a twenty-year-old-looking girl, described as wearing a water-soaked 1930s evening dress, who usually appears at night along the roadside of East Lawther Drive. Witnesses claim the phantom asks to be taken to her home on Gaston Avenue in Dallas before disappearing in the car during the ride leaving a waterlogged car seat. Legend claims the woman to be a drowning victim from a boating accident in the 1930s. Reports of the ghostly encounters were published in Dallas-area newspapers in the 1960s.

This legend is said to have been the inspiration for the bluegrass song Bringing Mary Home, written by John Duffey of The Country Gentlemen. Their version of the song made the Billboard Country Chart in 1965. The song has since been recorded by many others, including Frankie Miller, Mac Wiseman, Red Sovine, Ricky Skaggs, and Daniel O'Donnell. It is now regarded by many as a bluegrass standard. The legend was also the inspiration for Lakewood Brewing Company's second Legendary Series release, La Dame du Lac, a French farmhouse-style bière de garde.

The lake was shown on a map in the beginning of the TV show Cheaters.

== Gallery ==
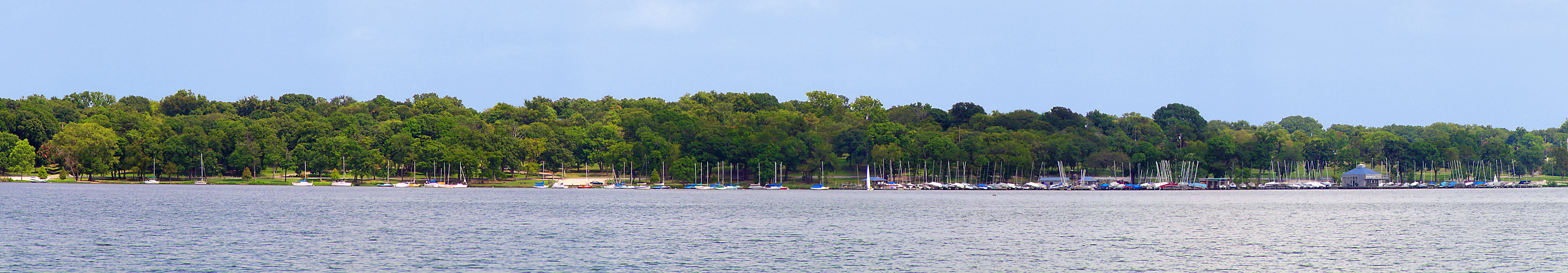
The northeastern shore of the lake, with marina

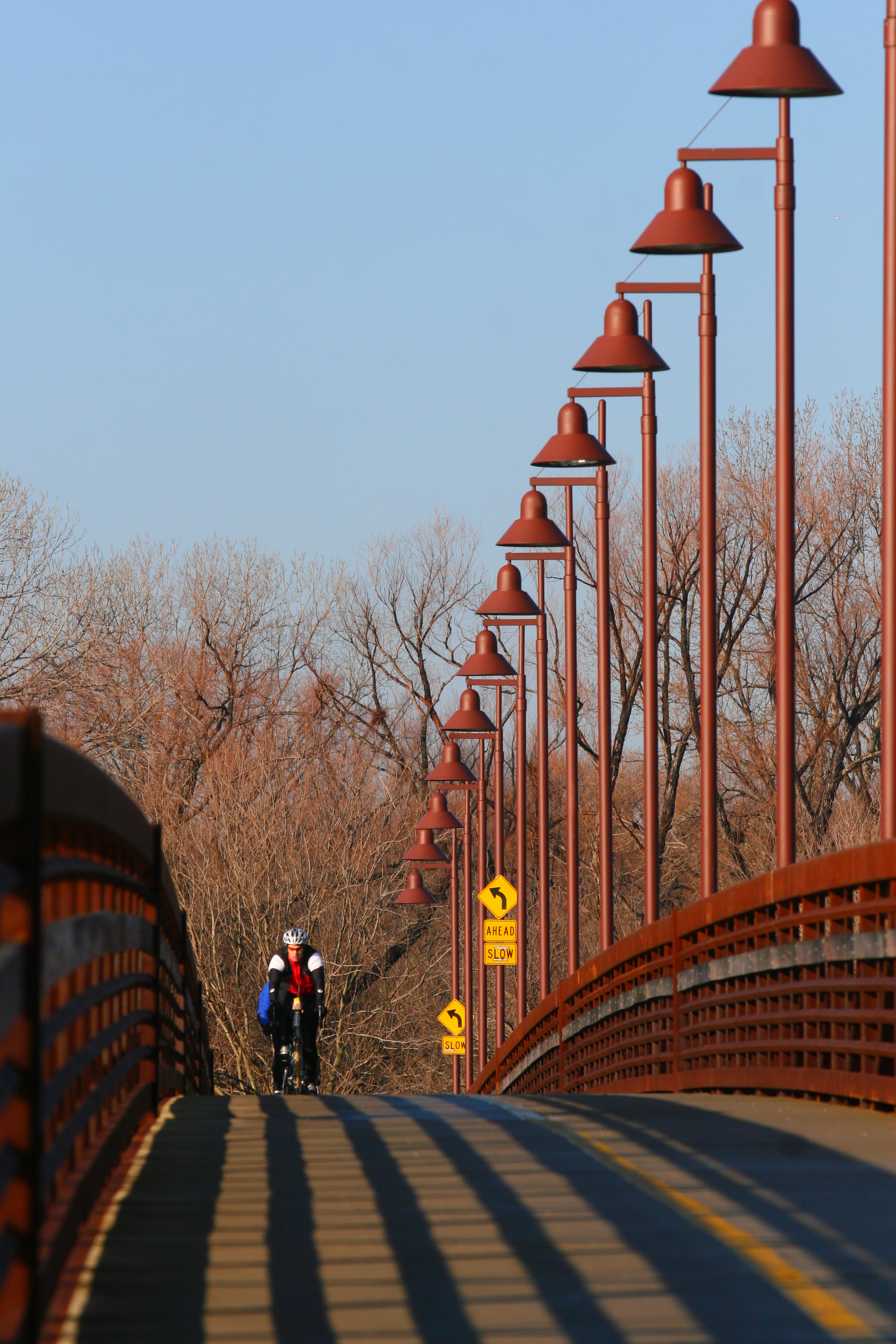

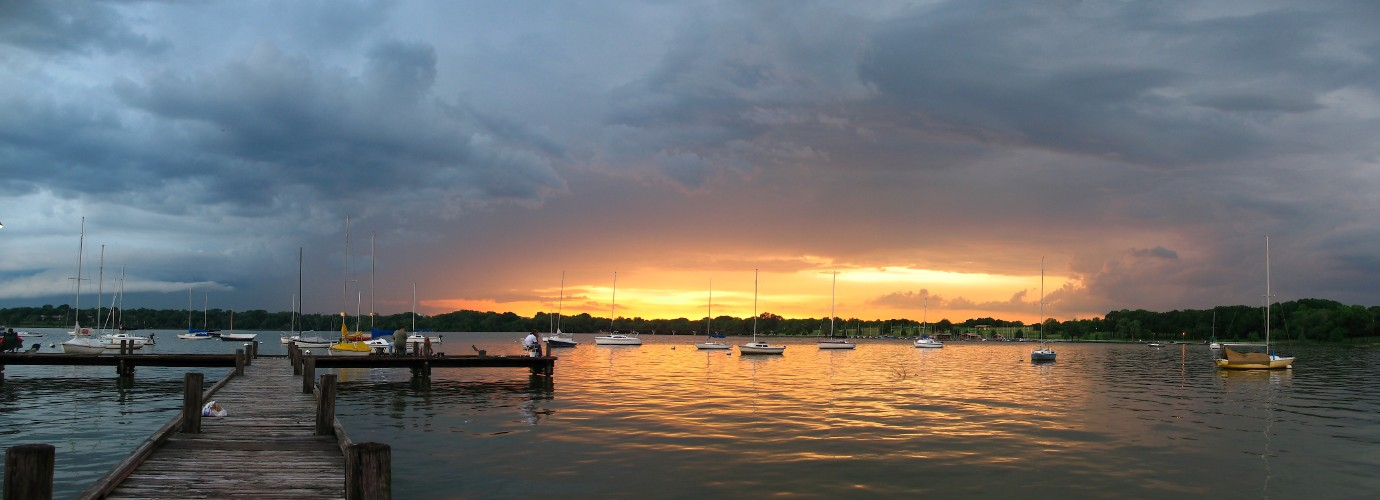

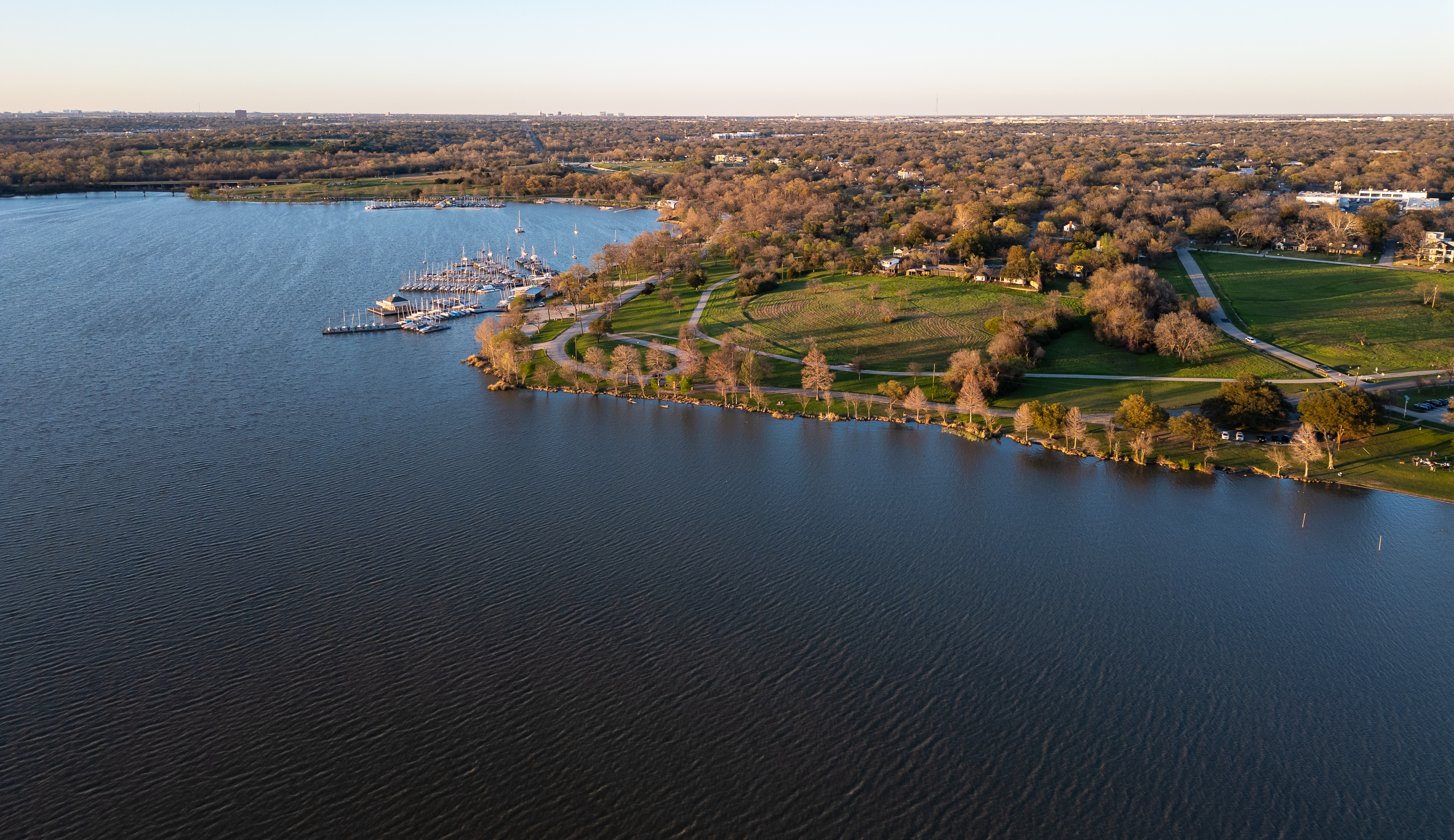

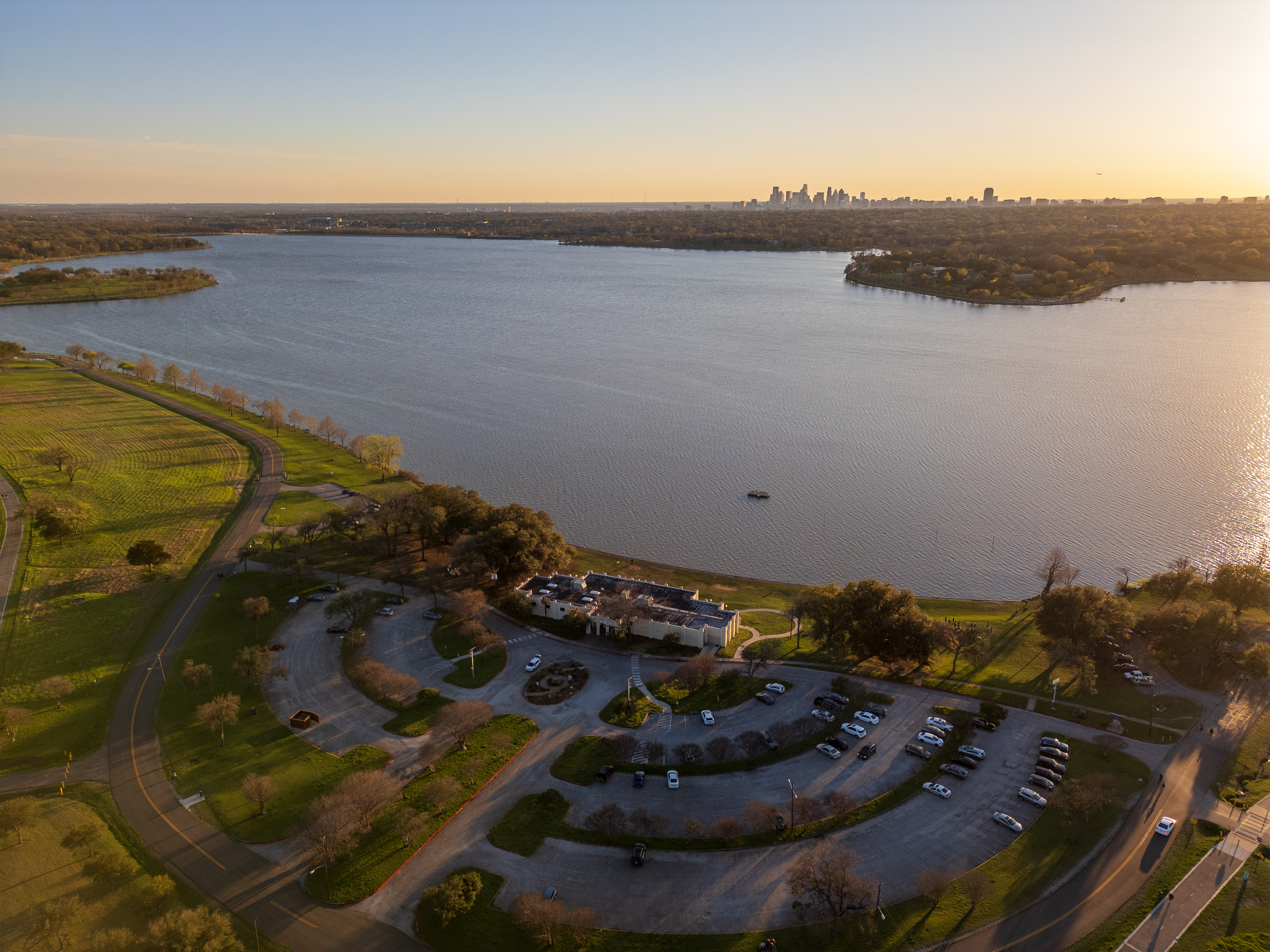
