= Midway Hollow, Dallas =

Midway Hollow
- Neighborhood
- Interactive map of Midway Hollow
- Coordinates: 32.87101°N 96.84655°W
- Country: United States
- State: Texas
- County: Dallas
- City: Dallas
- City Council Districts: 6 and 13

Area
  - Total: 1.0 sq mi (2.6 km^{2})

Population
  - Estimate (2023): 5,791
- ZIP Code: 75220
- Area code(s): 214, 469, 972

Midway Hollow is a residential neighborhood in northwest Dallas, Texas. It lies north of Love Field Airport and is bordered by Walnut Hill Lane to the north, Northwest Highway (Loop 12) to the south, Midway Road to the east, and Marsh Lane to the west. The area was farmland until the mid-20th century when a post-World War II housing boom transformed it into a suburban community. Midway Hollow contains approximately 2,600 single-family homes, and as of 2023 the neighborhood’s population is an estimated 5,800 residents. The housing stock is a mix of 1950s-built cottages and ranch-style houses alongside larger new homes built in the 21st century, giving the area an eclectic architectural character. Midway Hollow is part of the Dallas City Council Districts 6 and 13 and is served by the Dallas Independent School District.

== History ==
=== Early settlement ===
In the mid-19th century, what is now Midway Hollow consisted of open prairie and farm land on the northwest outskirts of Dallas. In 1841, the Republic of Texas granted large tracts in this area to settlers under the Peters Colony land grant program. Pioneer families such as the Livelys, Marshes, and Coppedges established farms here; their legacy remains in neighborhood street names like Lively Lane, Marsh Lane, and Coppedge Lane. Through the late 1800s and early 1900s, the vicinity remained rural and sparsely populated outside the Dallas city limits, with no defined “Midway Hollow” neighborhood yet in existence.

=== Postwar development ===
The transition from farmland to suburb began after World War II. In 1945, Dallas oilman Clint Murchison Sr. built one of the area’s first housing tracts at Northwest Highway and Marsh Lane – a development of 50 single-family bungalows constructed with insulated concrete, an innovative material at the time. Local entrepreneur Ebby Halliday (later a famed real estate broker) staged and sold these homes, creating one of Dallas’s first model home showcases. Priced at $7,000–$9,000 each (equivalent to about $95,000–$122,000 in 2025 dollars), all 50 houses sold in under a year. This successful tract for young families and returning veterans spurred further subdivision of the surrounding land. By the early 1950s, numerous new additions had filled the roughly one-square-mile area now known as Midway Hollow with single-story homes. Most of the original houses were modest brick cottages or ranch-style homes with 2–3 bedrooms, hardwood floors, and attached one-car garages – solidly built to meet the postwar housing demand. Some early homes were directly tied to nearby employers; for example, several postwar houses were built for workers at the aircraft plants and airlines operating at nearby Love Field Airport. Dallas annexed the growing community by the late 1940s, bringing it into the city and extending municipal services such as water and sewer lines to the new neighborhood. Midway Hollow quickly became a middle-class enclave of young families, with streets laid out in a curving grid and schools and churches established to serve the community.

Later developments

By the 1960s, the neighborhood was fully built out with around 2,600 homes and had entered a period of stability. Over the next few decades, little new construction occurred since almost all lots were already occupied by postwar houses. The area remained a quiet, middle-class neighborhood. Infrastructure improvements in the surrounding area during this time increased Midway Hollow’s accessibility – for example, Northwest Highway was widened into a busy arterial road (forming the neighborhood’s southern border), and the Dallas North Tollway opened in 1968 a short distance to the east, improving access to downtown. Within Midway Hollow, zoning remained strictly single-family, and no apartment complexes were built inside the neighborhood – commercial development was limited to the periphery at major intersections and along Northwest Highway. In 2007, the preservation organization Preservation Dallas included Midway Hollow on its annual list of Dallas’s “Most Endangered Historic Places,” citing the loss of original 1950s homes to teardowns. Neighborhood advocates at that time sought to obtain City of Dallas conservation district status to help manage new development, though formal conservation zoning was never adopted.

Around the early 2000s, Midway Hollow began to experience a resurgence in popularity. Realtors touted it as an “up-and-coming” alternative to the more expensive Preston Hollow area to the east, thanks to its central location and large lot sizes. Investors and homebuilders began purchasing the smaller 1950s houses in order to tear them down and build larger new homes. By the 2010s, the sounds of construction became common as one-by-one the original one-story bungalows were replaced with two-story custom houses featuring modern amenities. Property values rose sharply: a typical three-bedroom Midway Hollow cottage that might have sold for under $200,000 in the early 2000s was selling for over $300,000 by the late 2010s, and newly built homes were priced in the $700,000+ range. This rapid appreciation marked Midway Hollow’s transition from a “hidden gem” into a highly sought-after neighborhood for new families and professionals.

Residential development

Midway Hollow was developed primarily as a postwar suburban subdivision, and residential construction in the area occurred in distinct phases. The initial development phase in the late 1940s to early 1950s saw the creation of multiple platted additions filled with modest single-family houses. These early homes typically ranged from about 1,200 to 1,600 square feet and were built in a mid-century traditional or ranch style, aimed at providing affordable housing for returning veterans and young families. By 1955, the neighborhood’s housing stock was essentially complete, and little new construction took place for the next several decades. In the 1960s–1990s, most development activity was limited to home renovations or additions as the original owners aged in place; the overall number of homes remained around 2,600.

A second major phase of residential development began in the 21st century. Starting in the 2000s, developers and affluent buyers initiated a wave of tear-down redevelopment: original mid-century houses were demolished and replaced by substantially larger new-build homes. The new houses often exceed 3,000 square feet (roughly double the size of the originals) and take advantage of the neighborhood’s sizeable lots. As a result, Midway Hollow now contains an eclectic mix of housing – approximately half of the homes are still the original one-story 1950s cottages, while the rest are newer two-story constructions built since the 2000s. This redevelopment trend has significantly increased property values and altered the neighborhood’s appearance, while also prompting discussions about preserving its mid-century character.

=== Architecture ===
The predominant architectural style in Midway Hollow’s original housing is mid-20th-century traditional. Most of the neighborhood’s first homes, built in the late 1940s and 1950s, are single-story brick cottages or ranch-style houses with low-pitched roofs and simple, functional designs. Common features of these mid-century homes include hardwood floors, pier-and-beam foundations, plaster walls, and small interior details like built-in telephone nooks typical of the era’s construction. A few early houses were experimental for their time – for example, the 1945 Murchison-built homes used innovative insulated concrete walls, though outwardly they resembled the modest cottages of the period. Overall, the original housing stock was unpretentious and geared toward affordability and practicality for growing families.

Because very few lots were left undeveloped after the 1950s, there was minimal new construction in Midway Hollow during the latter 20th century. Instead, homeowners often updated or expanded the existing structures. By the 1970s and 1980s, some houses had received cosmetic facelifts or room additions, but the neighborhood’s architectural character remained dominated by its 1950s roots. During this time, Midway Hollow avoided the trend of multi-family or townhouse developments; thanks to city zoning that maintained single-family use, the one-story ranch aesthetic continued to define the area.

In the 2000s and 2010s, the influx of new construction introduced a wider variety of architectural styles. Many of the new homes are two-story houses that blend traditional and contemporary design elements. Some emulate Tudor revival or classic Georgian/Colonial details to complement the older homes, while others showcase modern designs with clean lines, large windows, and modern materials. A common style for new builds is a transitional modern ranch: for instance, a brick or stone first level with stucco or siding on the second level, front porches or porticos, and upscale interior amenities such as open floor plans and gourmet kitchens. In a few cases, builders have designed mid-century modern inspired new homes – single-story with wide eaves and minimalist facades – to better fit the scale of the neighborhood. The coexistence of original mid-century houses alongside large modern builds gives Midway Hollow an architecturally eclectic streetscape. Mature oak and pecan trees line the streets, providing a unifying canopy that contributes to the neighborhood’s charm and character despite the varied home styles.

=== Infrastructure and amenities ===
Midway Hollow’s street layout and infrastructure largely date to its mid-century development. The internal streets follow a traditional suburban grid mixed with gentle curves and cul-de-sacs, all feeding into the bounding arterial roads (Midway, Marsh, Walnut Hill, Northwest Highway). Within the neighborhood, the streets remain narrow and purely residential, helping to discourage cut-through traffic. Key public infrastructure was introduced when the area was annexed by Dallas in the late 1940s – city water and sewer lines allowed the dense tract-home development to replace the previous farms. Electrical and road improvements have been made incrementally over time; for example, the neighborhood was wired for cable TV and upgraded electric service by the 1980s, and street lighting has been improved in recent years.

The City of Dallas has maintained strict single-family zoning in Midway Hollow, which has preserved its residential character. No apartments or multifamily complexes exist inside the neighborhood’s boundaries; commercial establishments are limited to the edges, such as shopping centers along Northwest Highway and at major intersections. Notably, a large retail development at Northwest Highway and Midway Road includes a Central Market grocery store (opened in 2002) that serves as a popular amenity for residents, and another at Northwest Highway and Marsh Lane features a Target store.

Park and recreation facilities are accessible to the community. Immediately north of Midway Hollow is the Walnut Hill Recreation Center (at Walnut Hill Lane and Midway), which opened in 1960 and offers a public swimming pool, sports fields, and a playground. The Dallas Parks Department also established Brownwood Park along Walnut Hill Lane at Joe’s Creek, preserving a strip of greenbelt on the neighborhood’s northern edge. In the 2010s, the city opened the Northaven Trail, a paved walking and biking trail converted from a former rail line, which runs just north of Walnut Hill and connects Midway Hollow with a broader regional trail network.

Midway Hollow is served by Dallas Fire Department Station 35 (located on Walnut Hill Lane at Marsh), which provides fire and EMS coverage for the area. After a destructive EF3 tornado struck near the neighborhood in October 2019 (severely damaging several schools and infrastructure just to the east), the city invested in repairs and upgrades, including rebuilding the local elementary school and replacing damaged traffic signals along Walnut Hill Lane. The community’s active civic groups – such as the Midway Hollow Crime Watch – also contribute to infrastructure and safety improvements by working with city officials. The crime watch program, started in the 2000s, funds off-duty police patrols and organizes residents, which has helped keep crime rates very low (often fewer than a dozen incidents per month in the area).

=== Education ===
The neighborhood is within the boundaries of the Dallas Independent School District (DISD). Midway Hollow is served by several public schools: most of the area is zoned to Walnut Hill Elementary School (recently rebuilt and now an International Academy) or Stephen C. Foster Elementary School for grades K-5, while the northernmost portion is zoned to Withers Elementary School. Depending on the address, students attend either Medrano Middle School or Marsh (Henry W. Longfellow Career Exploration) Middle School for grades 6-8, and then continue to high school at either Thomas Jefferson High School (located just north of the neighborhood) or W. T. White High School. In addition to the public schools, the area is near several private schools; for example, the Episcopal School of Dallas lower school campus is about a mile north of Midway Hollow, and other private schools in the Preston Hollow vicinity serve local residents.

=== Demographics ===
As an unofficial neighborhood (not a separately incorporated city), Midway Hollow’s population is typically estimated from census tracts and local data. In 2023, the population of the Midway Hollow area was about 5,791, with a median household income around $120,000. The neighborhood has a roughly equal gender distribution and a median age in the mid-40s. Racially, as of 2023 approximately 72% of residents were White, 5% Black, 5% Asian, and about 11% of other or mixed races; around 22% of the population is of Hispanic or Latino heritage (of any race). The vast majority of housing units (over 85%) are detached single-family homes, and about three-quarters of households are owner-occupied, reflecting the neighborhood’s stable, long-term resident base.
