= 2019 North Dallas tornado =

2019 tornado in Texas, U.S.

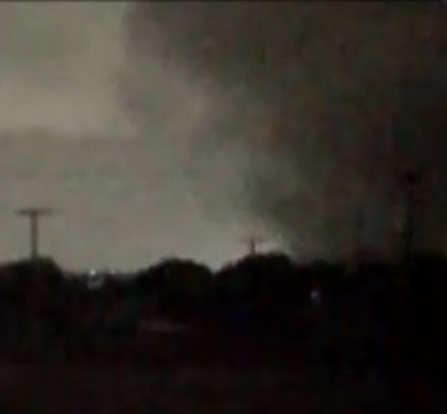
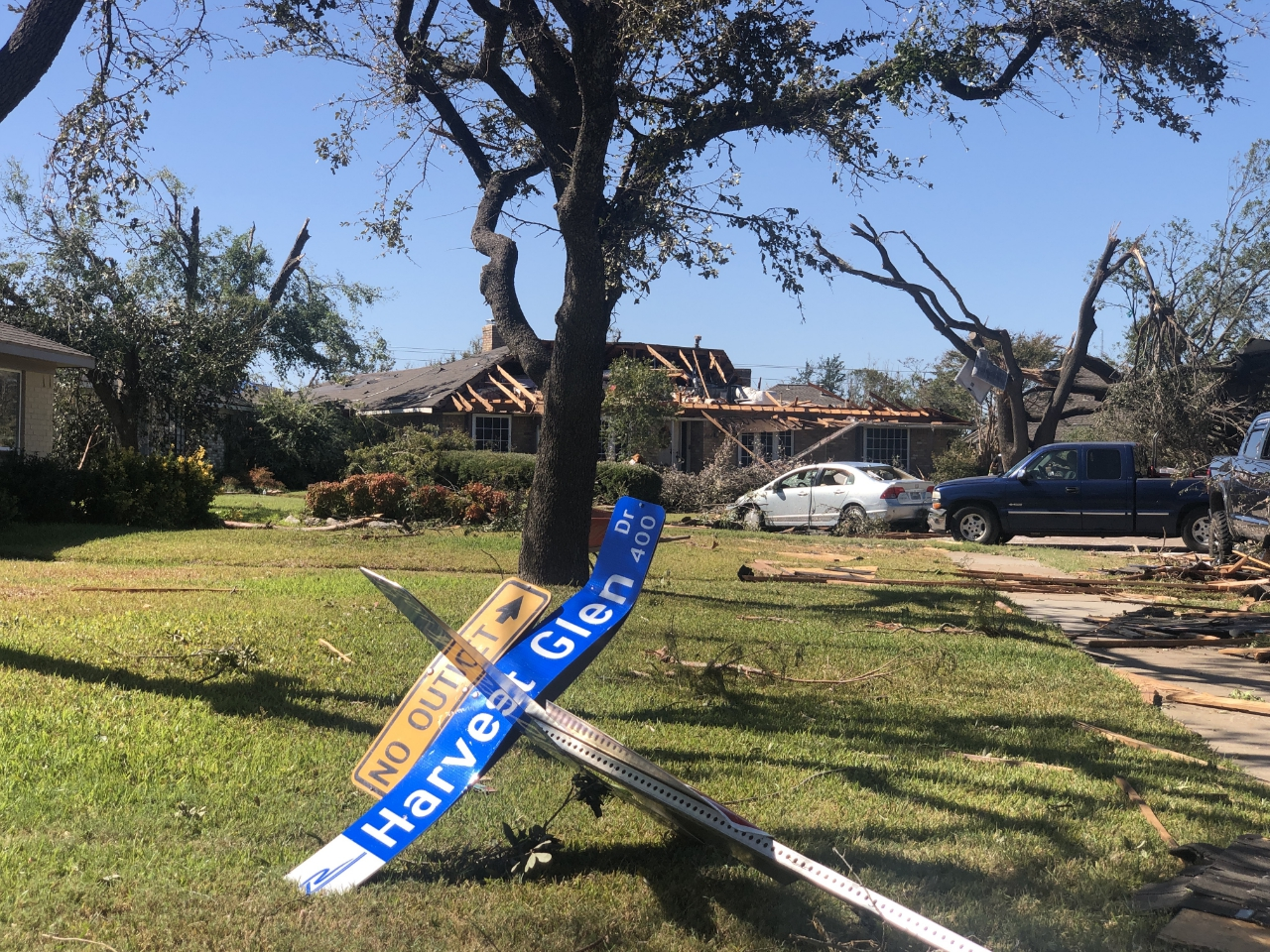
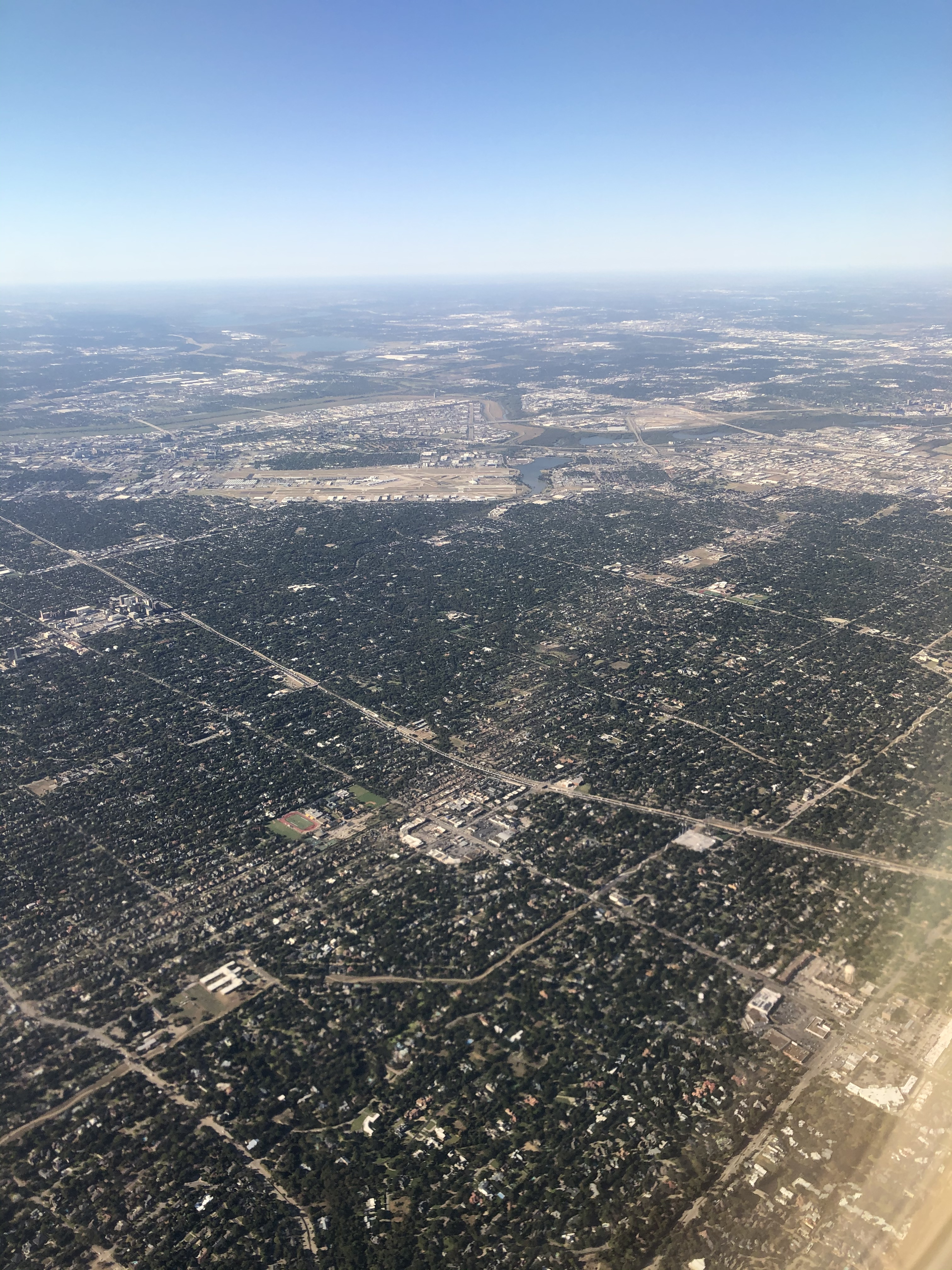
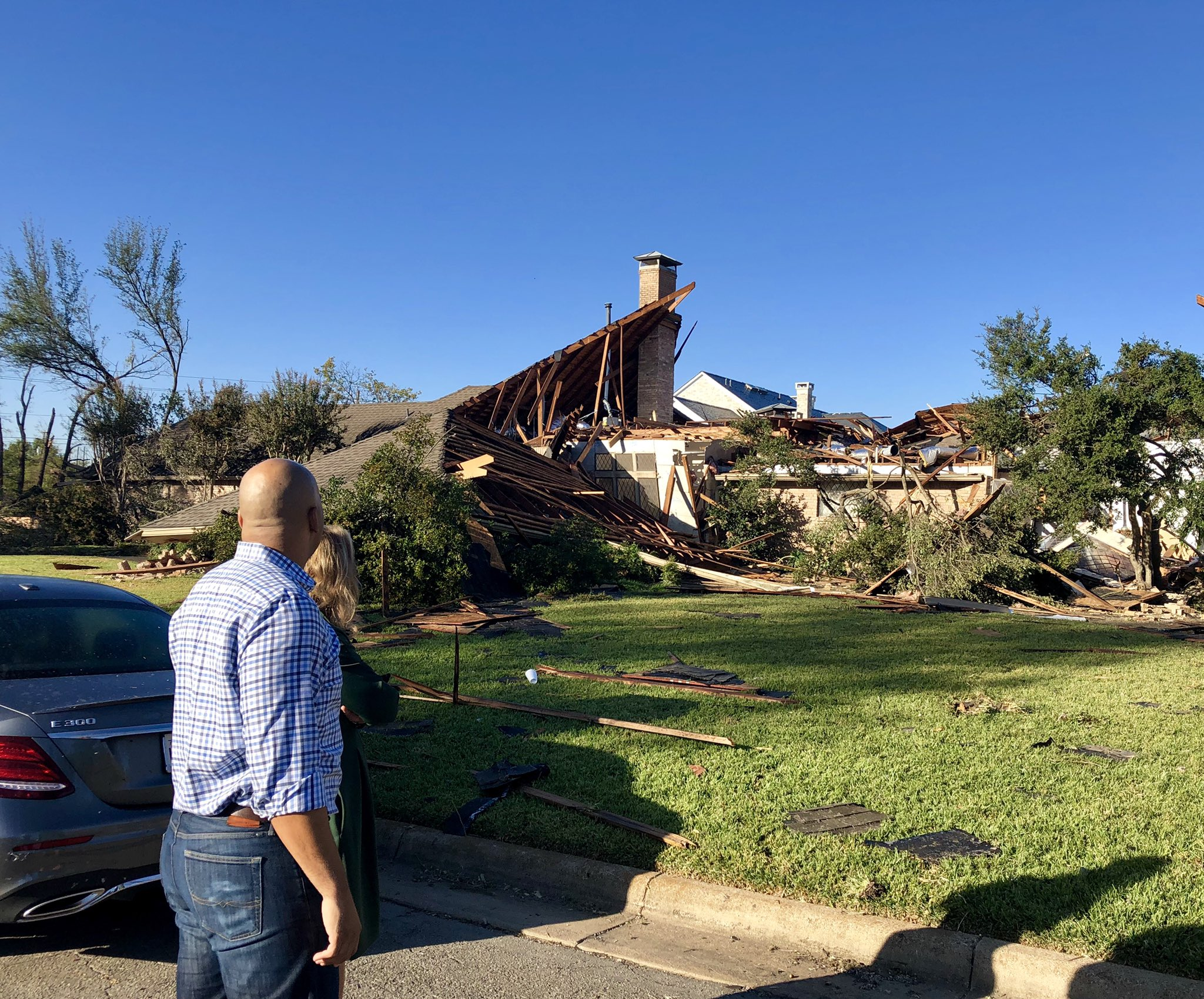
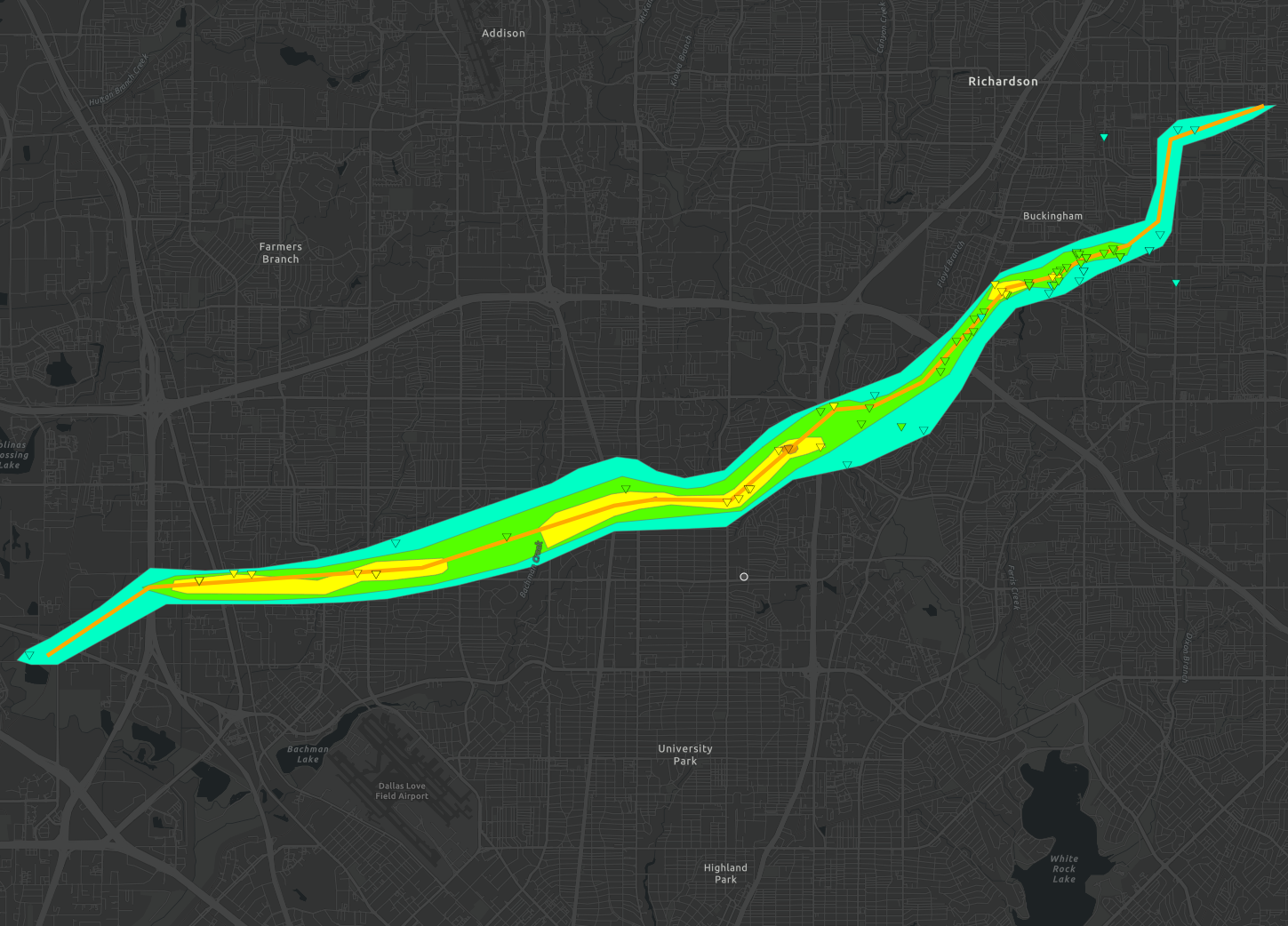
- Clockwise from top: The tornado as seen from a traffic camera in North Dallas; Aerial view of the tornado damage within North Dallas; The track of the tornado; U.S. Representative Colin Allred touring damage from the tornado; A knocked over street sign with a destroyed home in the background

Meteorological history
- Formed: October 20, 2019, 8:58 p.m. CDT
- Dissipated: October 20, 2019, 9:30 p.m. CDT
- Duration: 32 minutes

EF3 tornado
- on the Enhanced Fujita scale
- Max width: 1,300 yards (0.74 mi; 1.2 km)
- Path length: 15.76 miles (25.36 km)
- Highest winds: 140 mph (230 km/h)

Overall effects
- Fatalities: 0
- Injuries: 1
- Damage: $1.55 billion (2019 USD) (6th costliest tornado in US history)
- Areas affected: Dallas County, Texas, US, particularly North Dallas and Richardson
- Power outages: >175,000
- Houses destroyed: ~118 (Note: This figure likely includes more structures than just homes.)
- Part of the Tornado outbreak of October 20–22, 2019 and Tornadoes of 2019

During the evening hours of October 20, 2019, a large, intense, and extremely costly nocturnal tornado that was part of a late-season outbreak tracked 15.76 miles through the densely populated areas of North Dallas in Dallas County, Texas, United States, inflicting widespread damage to numerous structures. The tornado caused $1.55 billion (2019 USD) (Note: All amounts of money are in 2019 USD unless stated otherwise.) in damages, making it the second-costliest tornadic event in Texas history, and the sixth-costliest tornado in United States history. Thousands of homes and businesses were damaged to some degree by the tornado, with around 118 structures being completely destroyed.

The tornado first touched down in northwest Dallas, just north of the Trinity River Greenbelt Park, crossing Interstate 35E and inflicting damage to several commercial buildings near Harry Hines Boulevard. The tornado tracked south of Walnut Hill Lane, inflicting damage to numerous business and homes. A man was injured after the tornado heavily impacted a shopping center. The tornado crossed Marsh Lane before impacting a church, where a man hid underneath a breezeway to avoid being injured. The tornado then tracked over Cary Middle School, Jefferson High School, and Walnut Hill Elementary School, inflicting significant damage. The tornado turned to the northeast, damaging trees, numerous homes, and a fire station.

The tornado then struck a second shopping center where many customers were inside the businesses, including 12 people who took shelter inside a walk-in freezer. The tornado then reached peak intensity along Northhaven Road, where a home suffered EF3 damage with the roof being torn off and several walls collapsing. The tornado then crossed U.S Route 75, damaging numerous businesses at EF2 intensity. The tornado struck a Home Depot where the employees were evacuated less than an hour prior, demolishing portions of the building. The tornado turned eastward, damaging Dallas Lutheran School and the Texas Instruments campus before striking an apartment complex, causing damage to several units at EF1 intensity.

The tornado entered the city of Richardson, inflicting EF2 damage to numerous apartments and blowing out the windows of a low-rise office building. The tornado then tracked through several subdivisions, damaging numerous homes at EF1–EF2 strength. The tornado weakened as it entered the College Park subdivision, making several sharp turns and damaging trees before dissipating near North Jupiter Road after being on the ground for 32 minutes.

== Meteorological synopsis ==
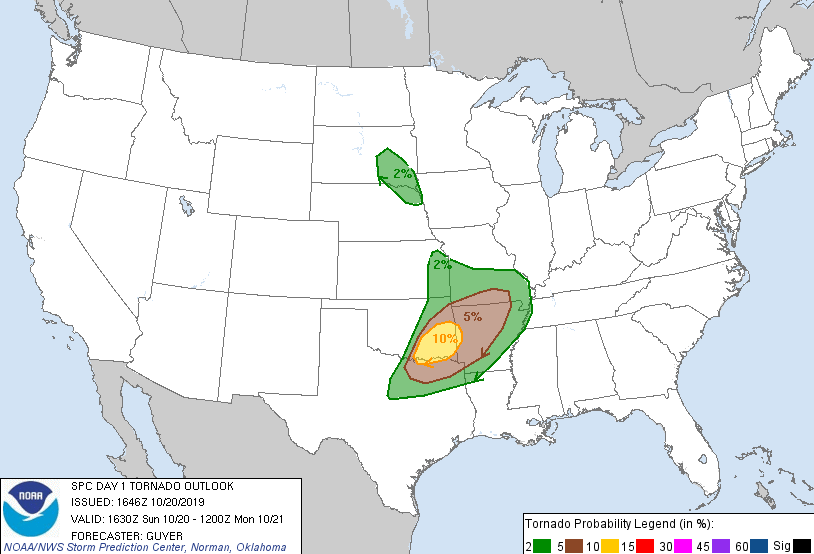
Probabilistic Tornado Graphic on 11:30 a.m., October 20, 2019

At 1:00 a.m. CDT (Note: All times listed in the article are in CDT unless stated otherwise.) on October 20, 2019, the Storm Prediction Center outlined an enhanced risk for southeastern Oklahoma, western Arkansas, and portions of northern Texas, as a strengthening trough tracked from the Rocky Mountains into the Great Plains, with strengthening wind shear and increasing moisture ahead of a cold front being present. Additionally, a slight risk was outlined for larger portions of the same regions. A 10% hatched risk (Note: A hatched risk is a 10% or greater probability of EF2+ tornadoes within 25 miles of a point within an area.) was outlined for portions of southeastern Oklahoma, and a 2% probability of a tornado within 25 miles (40 km) of a point was highlighted for surrounding regions, which included Dallas and surrounding areas. At 11:30 a.m., the Storm Prediction Center expanded the areas where a risk of tornadoes was present, with a 5% probability of a tornado within 25 miles (40 km) of a point including much of northeastern Texas, as a trough and strengthening polar jet positioned over the High Plains, and moisture continued to collect ahead of a cold front that was tracking southeastward, making the environment favorable for severe weather. On the evening of October 20, numerous thunderstorms began to develop over the Dallas–Fort Worth metroplex, with several storms developing ahead of a cold front, and additional storms developing into a squall line. These storms produced a total of 10 tornadoes, with the strongest being the EF3 that tracked through northern portions of Dallas.

== Tornado summary ==
=== Touchdown and beginning ===
The tornado touched down at 8:58 p.m. just southwest of State Highway 348 and near Luna Road, where it began to snap large tree branches and inflict minor damage to the roofs of buildings at EF0 intensity. The tornado began to track east-northeastward, crossing State Highway 348 and approaching Interstate 35E. As the tornado crossed the interstate, it turned sharply to the east and began to strengthen, inflicting EF1–EF2 damage to numerous commercial buildings as it approached Harry Hines Boulevard. The tornado struck a strip mall along Walnut Hill Lane and Shady Trail, collapsing several exterior walls at EF2 intensity with estimated wind speeds of 122 mph (196 km/h). The tornado then tracked south of the Harry Hines Boulevard/Walnut Hill Lane intersection, where numerous homes and businesses sustained EF1 to EF2-rated damage. The tornado maintained its intensity as it began to track just south of Walnut Hill Lane, where several gas stations, churches, and large commercial buildings sustained significant damage to their exterior walls and roofs, with at least one apartment complex being impacted as well. A large retail building along Walnut Hill Lane sustained high-end EF2 damage, with several exterior walls collapsing. Additionally, a smaller retail building along the same road was extensively damaged, with portions of the structure collapsing. The tornado then struck the Southwind Apartment complex along Brockbank Drive, inflicting significant damage and tearing the roofs off several units.

=== Impacts in North Dallas ===
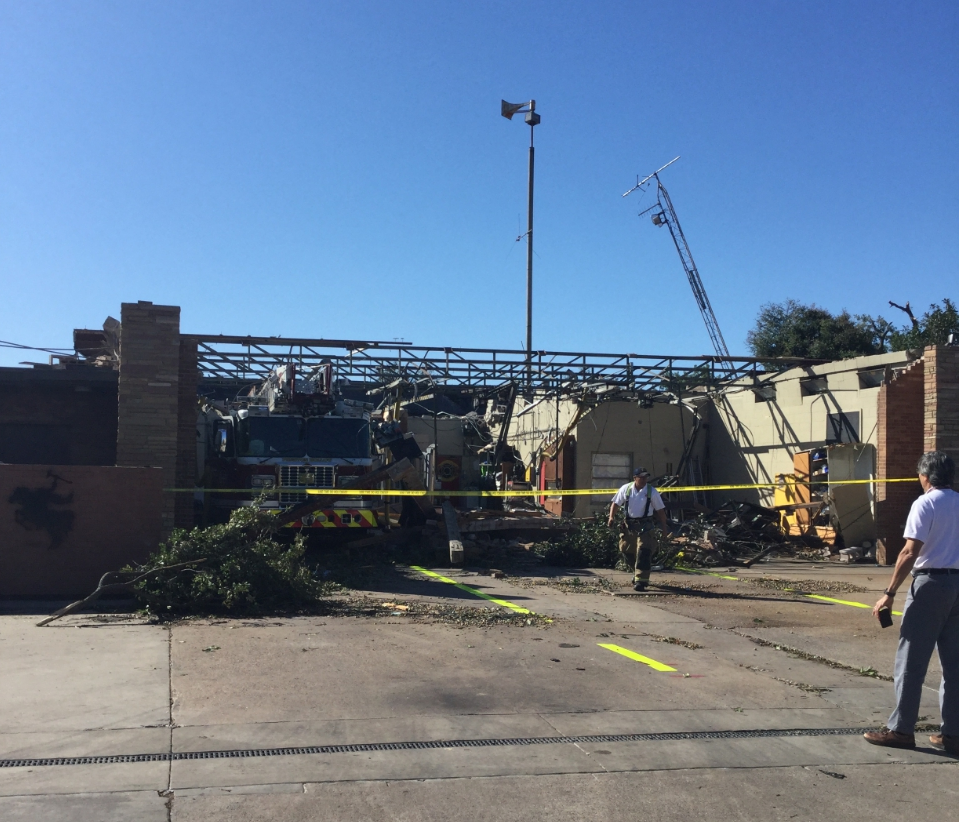
EF1 damage to Fire Station 41

The tornado continued to inflict EF1–EF2 damage as the tornado tracked east-northeastward, crossing Walnut Hill Lane and striking an apartment building along Glenrio Lane, tearing the entire roof off at EF2 strength. The tornado then struck the Marsh Lane Plaza, which had several customers at the time, heavily damaging the shopping center. One man was sucked out of the doorway of a Little Caesars store within the plaza, being injured by flying debris as he grabbed a pillar of the building's breezeway to keep himself from being carried by the tornado. Two other individuals were inside the restaurant as it was impacted, but remained unharmed after the building collapsed. The tornado tracked across Marsh Lane, with numerous homes and several businesses sustaining damage east of this road. A small professional building along the Marsh Lane/Walnut Hill Lane intersection sustained EF2 damage, with the entire structure collapsing. The tornado then struck the First Mexican Baptist Church along the Betty Jane Lane/Walnut Hill Lane intersection, with one man that was inside managing to seek shelter underneath a breezeway and remain unharmed. The church lost the majority of its roof, and several buildings on the property sustained severe damage. The tornado then impacted the Northway Church near the Hedgeway Drive/Walnut Hill Lane intersection, tearing front portions of the roof off. The tornado continued to maintain EF2 intensity as it crossed over both Edward H. Cary Middle School and Thomas Jefferson High School, inflicting significant damage to both structures. The tornado then turned to the northeast before striking Walnut Hill Elementary School, damaging 90% of the building. The tornado crossed Midway Road and tracked through Royalwood Estate, snapping large branches off hardwood trees at EF1 strength. The tornado damaged numerous residences and countless hardwood trees at EF1–EF2 strength with estimated wind speeds ranging from 110–125 mph (177–201 km/h) as it approached U.S. Route 75, with many of the homes that suffered roof and exterior wall damage being large and well-built. Dallas Fire Station 41 along Royal Lane was impacted at EF1 intensity, with the entire roof being stripped away and several walls being damaged. Several firefighters were inside the building as it was struck, but no injuries were reported. The tornado then impacted the Preston Royal shopping center on Preston Road and Royal Lane, where Central Market had several employees and around 20 customers inside, with the building sustained significant damage. Numerous other businesses and restaurants within the shopping center were damaged, including Fish City Grill, where 12 employees and customers took shelter in the walk-in freezer as the restaurant was struck.

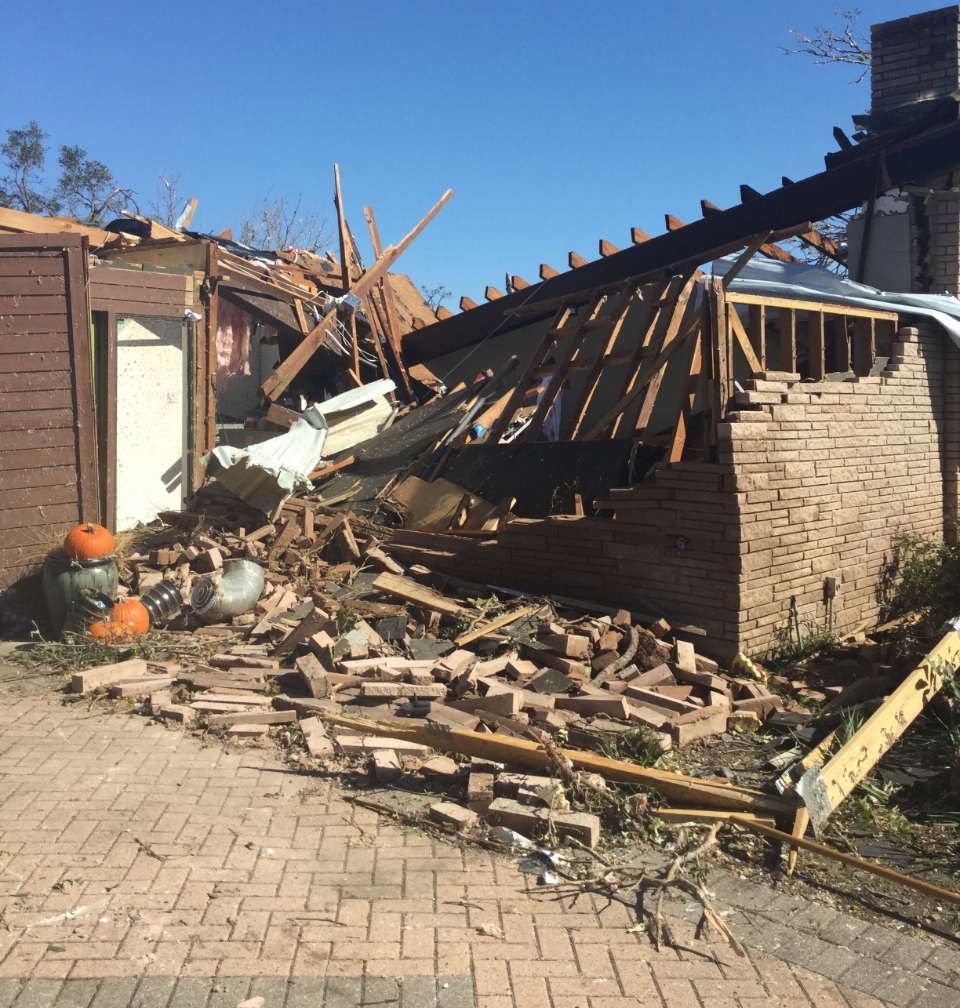
Low-end EF3 damage to a home along Northhaven Road

==== Peak intensity in North Dallas ====
The tornado briefly strengthened to EF3 intensity as it tracked just north of the Mum Place/Camellia Drive intersection, before weakening as it began to parallel Tulip Lane to the south. The tornado heavily impacted St. Mark's School of Texas along Preston Road, completely destroying the campus's athletic center and significantly damaging several other buildings on the property, including the fine arts center. The tornado continued to damage homes at EF2 intensity as it tracked eastward between Tulip Lane and Orchid Lane, significantly damaging the roof of a home with estimated wind speeds of 115 mph (185 km/h) as it crossed Hillcrest Road. The tornado made a sharp turn to the northeast just before crossing just north of the Forest Glade Circle/Orchid Lane intersection, crossing Forest Glade Circle a second time before tracking across Royal Lane and Saint Judes Drive. A house along Royal Lane was damaged at EF2 strength, with large portions of the roof being torn away from estimated wind speeds of 122 mph (196 km/h). The tornado continued to damage structures at EF2 strength while crossing numerous residential streets, with a large house near the Northhaven Road/Pebble Downe Drive sustaining significant damage to its roof. The tornado once again briefly strengthened to low-end EF3 intensity with estimated wind speeds of 140 mph (230 km/h) as it tracked over Northhaven Road, where a single-family house on the north side of the street was destroyed. The entire roof was torn away and several exterior walls collapsed. This home was the only structure impacted by the tornado that was assigned an EF3 rating by damage surveyors.

==== Further impacts in North Dallas ====
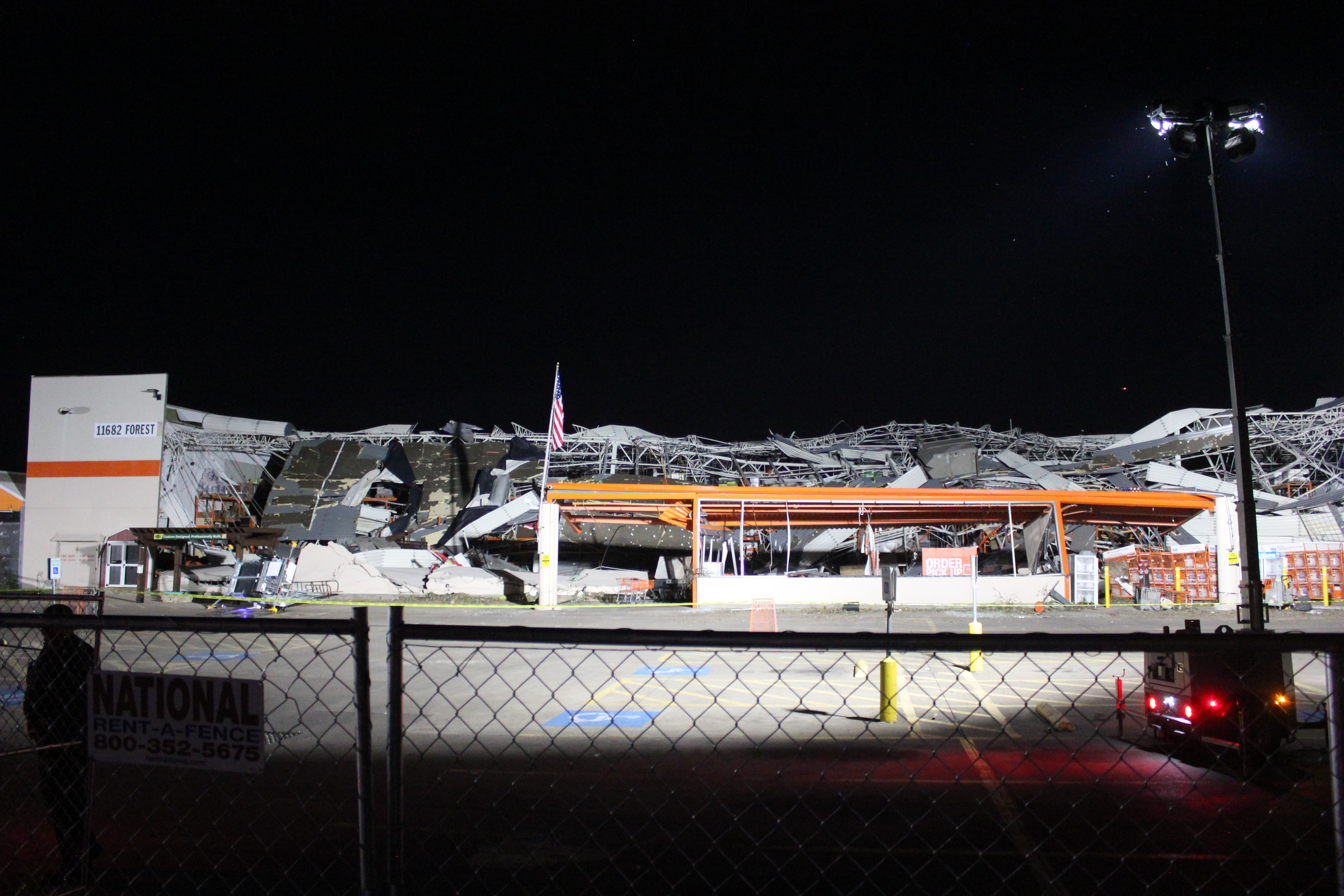
EF2 damage to a Home Depot

The tornado crossed U.S Route 75, damaging numerous businesses, including several office buildings and a car dealership, at EF2 strength. An office building along the east side of the highway sustained EF2 damage of 115 mph (185 km/h), with numerous windows being blown in or shattered. The tornado continued northeastward, crossing the Bonnie Drive/Forest Central Drive intersection before destroying a Home Depot along Forest Lane at high-end EF2 strength, with portions of the building collapsing and the roof being torn away. Nobody was in the building when it was destroyed, as the assistant store manager sent the employees home less than an hour before the tornado struck due to impending severe weather. The tornado turned to the east as it inflicted EF1 damage, with the Dallas Lutheran School along Stults Road having portions of its roof ripped away. The tornado crossed Forest Lane before tracking over southern portions of the Texas Instruments campus, shattering windows. The tornado then turned further to the northeast and began to parallel Greenville Avenue, where numerous trees and buildings sustained EF1 damage. A mid-rise office building along Markville Drive was struck by the tornado, with several windows being blown out at EF1 intensity with estimated wind speeds of 105 mph (169 km/h). The tornado then struck a motel along Vantage Point Drive, inflicting EF1 damage. The tornado tracked across Interstate 635 before damaging a low-rise building and striking an apartment complex along Greenville Avenue and Amberton Parkway, where dozens of units sustained EF1-rated roof damage.

=== Impacts in Richardson and dissipation ===
The tornado uprooted trees and snapped power poles as it crossed Walnut Street, entering the city of Richardson. The tornado struck the Walnut Abrams Plaza, with several windows being shattered or damaged at EF2 strength with estimated wind speeds of 116 mph (187 km/h). The tornado then tracked through the Cutters Point apartment complex, damaging numerous units at EF2 intensity, with many sustaining significant roof loss. A nearby low-rise office building had windows on all sides of the structure blown out. The tornado then entered several subdivisions, where it damaged numerous trees and residences. The tornado first tracked through the Richland Park subdivision, where numerous houses sustained EF1–EF2 damage. The tornado continued northeastward, tracking into the Lakes of Buckingham subdivision, where more houses sustained EF1-rated roof damage and a service station canopy was destroyed.

The tornado crossed Audelia Road before tracking through southern portions of the Richland Meadows subdivision, where houses were damaged at EF1 intensity. A home along Horseshoe Bend sustained significant roof damage due to a weak spot on the southwest side of the structure. The tornado tracked across Centennial Boulevard before entering the College Park subdivision, where it weakened to EF0 intensity. The tornado damaged and uprooted trees as it made a sharp turn to the north, just west of Richardson Square. The tornado tracked over Glenville Park and began to parallel North Plano Road to the west as it crossed over Twin Rivers Park and Mark Twain Park while inflicting EF0 damage to trees. The tornado then made a sharp turn to the east as it entered Apollo Park, crossing northern portions of Huffhines Park and narrowing as it entered northern portions of Duck Creek. The tornado tracked north of Dartmouth Elementary School before tracking over several residential streets, dissipating just after crossing North Jupiter Road at 9:30 p.m.

== Aftermath ==
=== Damage ===
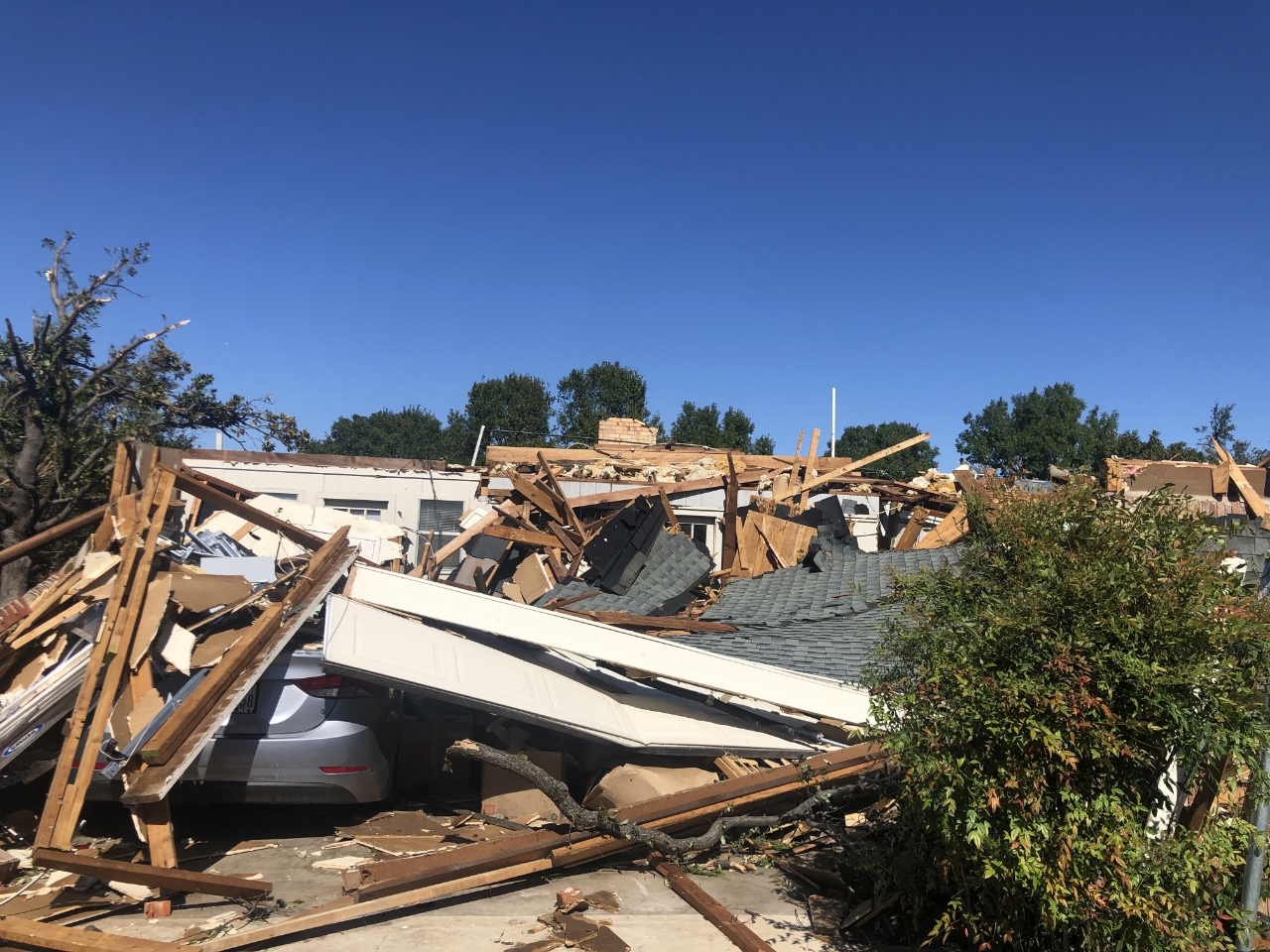
A home that was devastated by the tornado

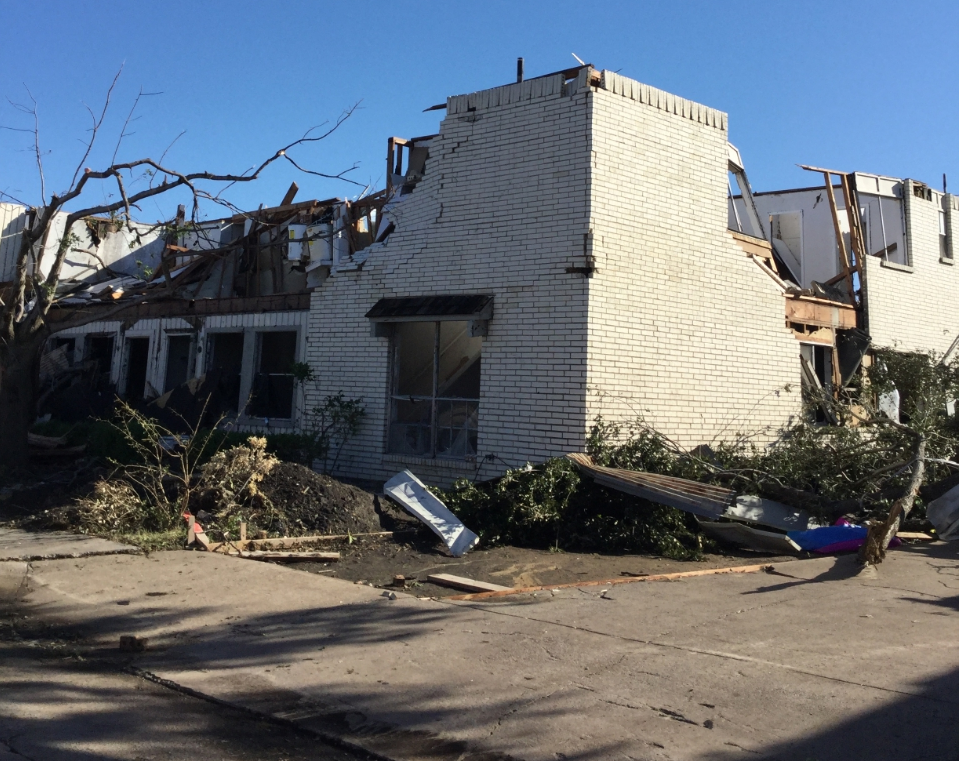
Significant damage to a multi-residential structure

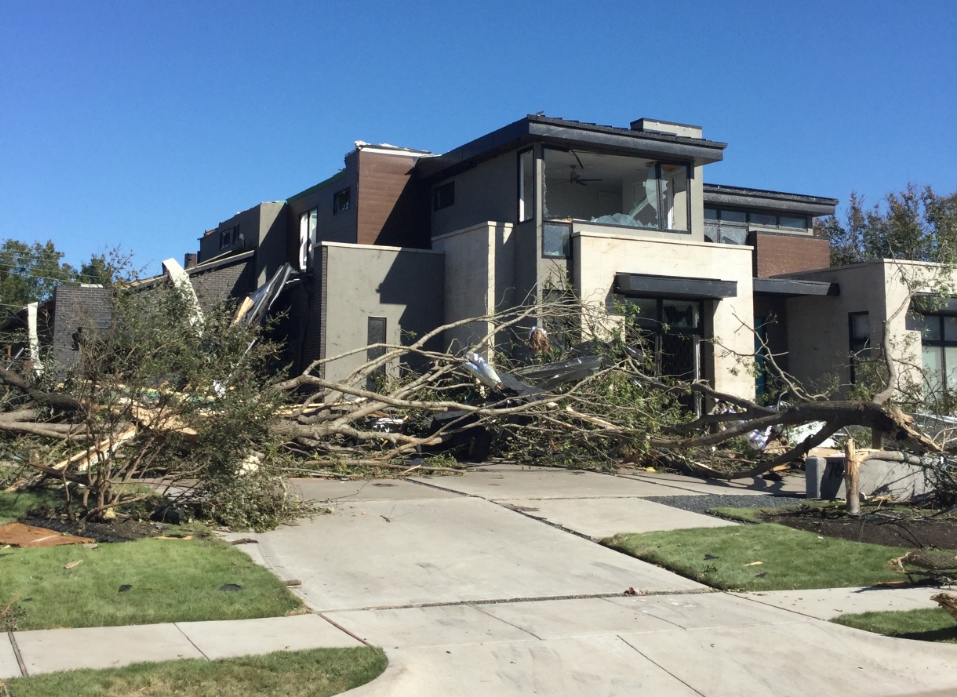
A large home that sustained damage from the tornado

Damage within the city of Dallas was extensive, with an estimated 3,000 homes and 1,000 businesses being damaged, of which around 106 were completely destroyed. The city of Richardson suffered significant damage as well, with 671 structures being impacted, 60 sustaining major damage, and 12 being completely destroyed, with 54 single family homes and 196 multi-residential units being unsafe to occupy. Debris were lofted over 20,000 feet (6,100 m) into the air by the tornado, and around 7,000 street signs were damaged. Over 175,000 customers lost power in the wake of the tornado, and over 40 gas leaks were reported. Several Dallas Independent School District (DISD) schools were significantly damaged by the tornado, with the most affected being Edward H. Cary Middle School, Thomas Jefferson High School, and Walnut Hill Elementary School. Cary Middle School suffered extensive damage, with portions of the roof collapsing, including at the gymnasium. 90% of the windows on the east and south sides of the building were completely shattered, and flashing was peeled off and completely removed. Several trees were damaged near the front of the school, and a police car in the school's parking lot was tossed across the lot and onto a fence by the tornado. The school's portable classrooms were completely destroyed, and all the rooftop HVAC systems were removed.

The nearby Thomas Jefferson High School sustained significant damage, with 10% of the roof being torn away, 30% of the windows being destroyed, and 75% of the building sustaining some kind of damage. The school's baseball fields, tennis court post, and fences were demolished, and 17 portable classrooms were damaged. The building's flashing was peeled by the tornado, and gutters and downspouts were torn away. Several rooftop HVAC systems were knocked over, and the gymnasium had 1,000 sq ft (93 m^{2}) of roofing removed. Two different sized storage containers from the school's parking lot were lifted and carried by the tornado, before landing near Gooding Street. The larger container, which was full of furniture, landed on top of a house 984 ft (300 m) from its starting position, and the smaller container landed 1,083 ft (330 m) from its origin point. Walnut Hill Elementary School had large portions of the roof demolished, and 80% of the windows along the south, west, and east sides of the building were shattered or destroyed. Around 90% of the building sustained damage. All the school's portable classrooms were demolished, and trees in front and behind the building sustained damage. The flashing on the school was entirety torn away, and all rooftop HVAC systems were removed. Portions of the auditorium roof were torn off, leading to a sprinkler malfunction that flooded part of the building.

The First Mexican Baptist Church in Dallas was significantly damaged by the tornado, with large portions of the roof removed from the main sanctuary building. A small house used for children's ministries was destroyed, and a separate sanctuary building was flooded. Over 100 tons of debris were left on the church site following the tornado. Several other churches nearby, including the Iglesia Cristiana Emanuel that was across the street from First Mexican Baptist Church, sustained heavy damage, with one barely staying upright. The Northway Church's main sanctuary, which was designed by George Dahl in 1952 to resemble Noah's Ark, was destroyed. The front portion of the roof was entirely torn away, and windows were shattered. Wood beams that supported the structure were splintered, and several trees on the property were uprooted and dispersed into the building.

Dallas Fire Station 41 was significantly damaged by the tornado, with the entire roof being torn away and several walls being destroyed. St. Mark's School of Texas was impacted, with all 11 buildings on the property being damaged. The most damaged of these were the Hicks Athletic Center, with several walls being knocked over, and the Decherd Fine Arts Center, which sustained significant damage. The roofs of all the school's buildings were seriously damaged by flying debris, and gutters and downspouts were torn off and scattered throughout the campus. Dallas Lutheran School sustained severe damage, with the main building having portions of its roof torn away and thrown against nearby structures. A garage collapsed on top of the school's Ford Transit, and several smaller buildings on the property were demolished. The school's gym and gathering hall had windows shattered, HVAC units displaced, and siding torn off.

The Preston Royal shopping center suffered damage to many stores, and had the southern portion of its roof torn away. The Interabang Books store within the shopping center was significantly damaged, with the interior being destroyed. Fish City Grill had its roof and walls severely damaged by the tornado. Central Market suffered significant damage, and had to be completely rebuilt. My Family's Pizza was damaged and closed for the first time in over 55 years, and Greek Isles Grille & Taverna had windows shattered by the tornado.

The Southwind Apartments located near Walnut Hill Lane was devastated, with numerous units becoming unlivable after the tornado struck, including several that had their roofs stripped away. A car dealership along Forest Lane had its glass walls shattered, and a billboard was toppled over. Numerous trees were damaged and uprooted, and several vehicles sustained damage.

KNON-FM's studio sustained a direct hit, with the rear entrance being damaged, windows being blown out, and ceilings collapsing. Several cars and poles outside the building were damaged by the tornado. The radio station was knocked off the air for two days. The Texas Instruments campus in Dallas suffered shattered windows, water damage, and debris on the property. The Cutters Point apartment complex in Richardson was significantly damaged, with countless units having their roofs torn away.

In total, the tornado caused $1.55 billion in damages, becoming the sixth-costliest tornado in United States history, and the second-costliest tornado in Texas history, behind the tornado that struck Lubbock, Texas on May 11, 1970.

==== Dallas Home Depot ====
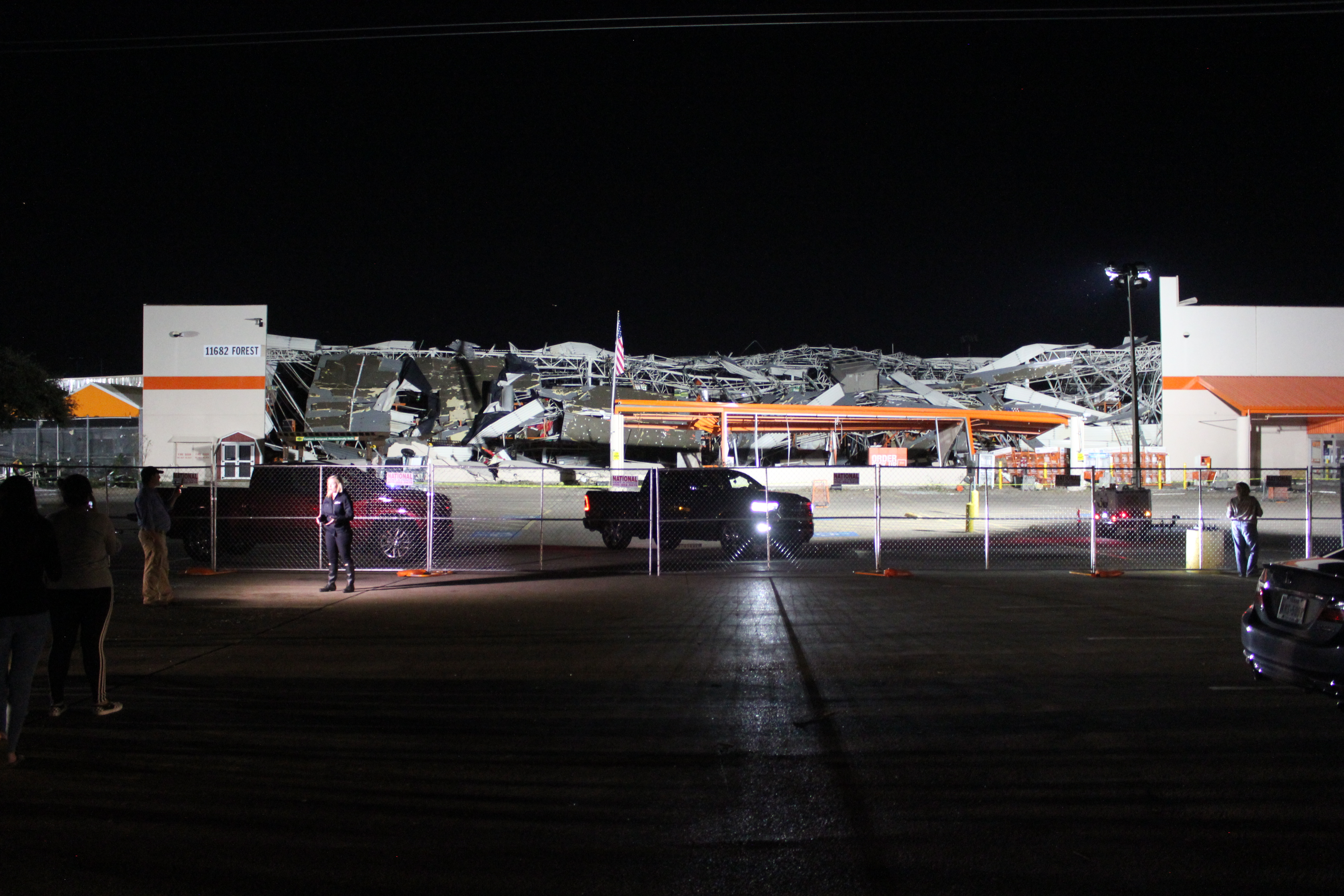
Onlookers viewing the tornado-damaged Home Depot

The Home Depot along Forest Lane was demolished by the tornado, with several tilt-up wall panels on the front side of the building falling inward, and a large portion of the roof collapsing. The assistant manager of the Home Depot, Jordan Jasper, decided to send four employees home early at 8 p.m., before leaving early with five other associates 42 minutes later. Less than an hour later, the tornado struck the now-unoccupied Home Depot. Following the tornado, around 500 Home Depot employees met at the damaged store to discuss the company loss with regional and district managers. An American flag that was still waving on a flagpole outside the store was taken down to be sent to a Home Depot office museum in Atlanta, Georgia. However, the flag was instead presented to Jasper, to honor his action of sending employees home ahead of the tornado, which potentially saved their lives. The destroyed store in Dallas was the first weather-related total loss for Home Depot since a location in Joplin, Missouri was destroyed by a tornado in 2011, where seven people were killed. Two deputies were charged with looting the Home Depot.

=== Recovery efforts ===
Following the tornado, over 400 firefighters and first responders originating from 13 separate agencies were deployed to the Dallas area, searching for and rescuing people that were trapped by debris and assessing the damage left behind. In the hours following the tornado, members of the Salvation Army opened a mobile kitchen to provide coffee, energy bars, water, and additional snacks to those impacted. A fire command post was set up, with members serving 200 people before a second Salvation Army unit arrived to provide additional support. Three mobile units were deployed to affected areas to provide food and beverages to tornado survivors and first responders. Several additional units and another mobile kitchen were deployed the following morning.

The American Red Cross set up two assistance centers, and provided $450 to impacted families that applied and qualify. Additionally, the organization provided food, cleaning supplies, and physical and mental health support to those affected. Planet Fitness allowed individuals to use their services and facilities, including showers and gym equipment, without charge at locations near the affected areas. North Texas Food Bank collaborated with the Salvation Army and American Red Cross to supply food and water to those impacted. A YMCA location along Northaven Road in Dallas allowed those impacted by the storms to use the facility's locker rooms and showers, along with towels, body wash, and shampoo. Additionally, access to charging ports in the lobby, coffee, the pool, fitness classes, and gym equipment were offered without any charge during business hours.

Alamo Drafthouse provided free tickets to PG-rated movies at three locations in Las Colinas, Lake Highlands, and Richardson, and allowed those impacted to charge their devices at the bars. Six U-Haul companies allowed those affected by the storm to have 30 days of free storage and access to mobile storage units at 52 locations across North Texas. On the Road Lending, a nonprofit, aided individuals who lost their vehicles in the storm by offering disaster mobility program services and assisting people in buying a vehicle.

A multi-agency resource center (MARC) opened on October 28 at The Church of Jesus Christ of Latter-day Saints located on Midway Road, and provided access to numerous resources for those affected by the severe weather.

Around 100 Southern Methodist University students assisted in clearing debris and tarping damaged roofs, and Samaritan's Purse deployed a response team to the affected areas from California. Additionally, Mercy Chefs provided meals to tornado survivors and volunteers. Over 300 North Texas Conference volunteers assisted in affected areas, with individuals providing meals and clearing debris. Christ's Foundry and Lovers Lane United Methodist Church provided hundreds of meals to those affected by the tornado.

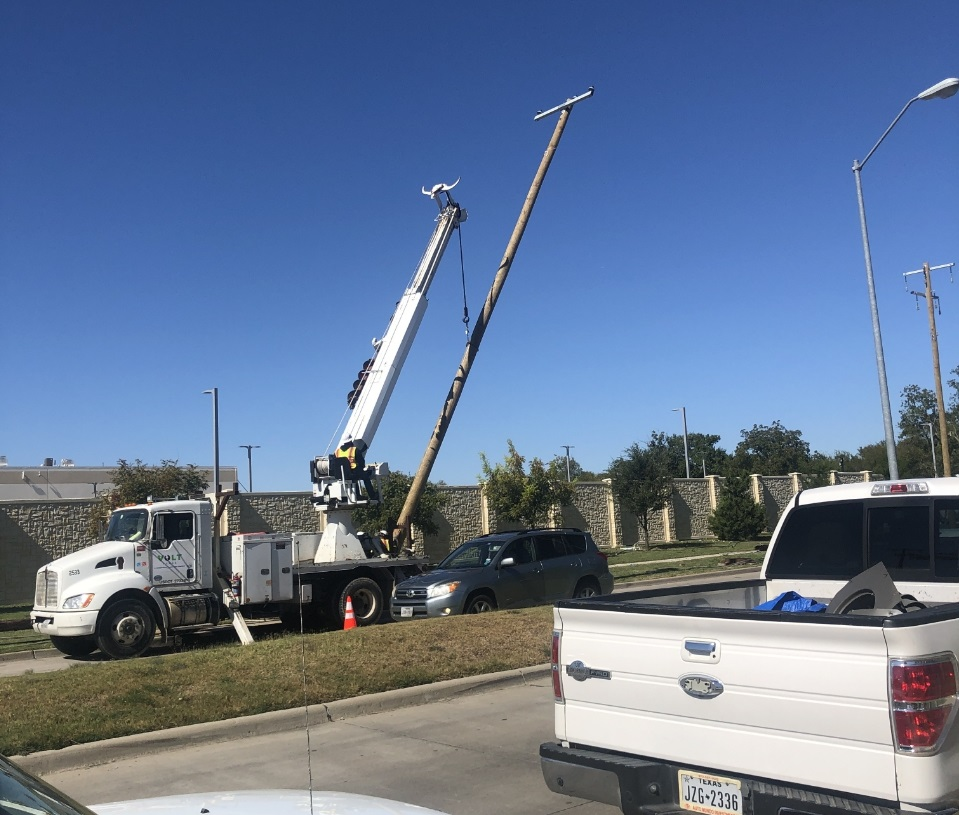
Crews working on replacing powerlines in Richardson following the tornado

The city of Richardson set up a Volunteer Coordination Center on October 24, in order to connect willing volunteers with tornado victims. The center was open for six days, and connected 165 volunteers to those affected. The city of Dallas organized crews consisting of people from Oncor Electric Delivery, Atmos Energy, Dallas Water Utilities, Dallas Police Department, and the Dallas Fire-Rescue Department, along with people from the Public Works, Transportation, Code enforcement, Sanitation, Parks, and 311 departments of Dallas. U.S. Route 75 was temporarily closed as Oncor crews removed a downed billboard from powerlines, and the Dallas Police Department set up 350 road barricades to assist with closing roads.

The Gene and Jerry Jones Foundation donated $1 million to Thomas Jefferson High School, to fund the construction of a new athletics field. Mark Cuban made a donation of $100,000 to the Dallas Education Foundation, before making an additional $1 million donation to DISD. Around 2,000 members of the Allstate Foundation located in the Dallas-Fort Worth area gathered school supplies to support schools that were damaged by the tornado. Additionally, the Allstate Foundation gave a $40,000 grant to DISD. The Wells Fargo Foundation provided a donation of $50,000 to DISD, and on November 15, Dallas Cowboy Kavon Frazier visited students at Walnut Hill Elementary, and donated thousands of dollars worth of school supplies.

Central Market donated $50,000 to DISD to assist in damage repairs to the affected schools, and to replace school supplies. Half Price Books donated 2,500 books to those affected, and Richland College provided tuition-free classes. The Texas Rangers donated $4,500 in gift cards and supplies to DISD.

By November 11, over 50,000 cubic yards (38,000 m^{3}) of debris were cleared from the city of Richardson, with 41,501 cubic yards (31,730 m^{3}) of vegetation and 11,438 cubic yards (8,745 m^{3}) of construction debris being removed. Large trailers were used to transport debris, and over 700 trips from the city to deposit sites were made. In Dallas, 323,509 cubic yards (247,340 m^{3}) of debris were collected by December 31.

Around 20 schools in the Dallas area were closed following the tornado, with several sustaining significant damage. Nearly 3,000 students that attended Cary Middle School, Thomas Jefferson High School, and Walnut Hill Elementary School were relocated to several other schools after the tornado. All 1,880 students from Thomas Jefferson High School were moved to Thomas A. Edison Middle Learning Center that was 9 miles (14 km) away, and Walnut Hill Elementary's 400 students were relocated to Tom Field Elementary School. Cary Middle School's 560 students were split between Medrano and Ben Franklin middle schools.

Thomas Jefferson High School was rebuilt in the years after the tornado, with some parts of the building being refurbished and new portions being added. A new gym, football field, media room, and computer lab were constructed, and hallways were made wider. Walnut Hill Elementary School and Cary Middle School were combined to form the Walnut Hill International Leadership Academy at a new building, which featured grade levels from kindergarten through eighth grade.

Around 165 volunteers assisted in clearing debris from the Dallas Lutheran School campus, which suffered $6.5 million in damages. Classes were temporarily held online and in portable classrooms as the campus was rebuilt. The new campus featured new office spaces, 15 classrooms, two computer labs, and fine arts rooms, which allowed the amount of students at the school to increase from 155 to around 250.

The Home Depot on Forest Lane reopened a year later, with new checkout and customer services areas, additional storage, and two areas where customers can pick up products that were purchased online. The store had 50 previous employees return, along with 150 new hirees.

Central Market reopened two years after the tornado, as the entire building had to be rebuilt. Around 60% of the former employees returned, and the store added 200 available jobs.

==== Texas disaster declaration ====
On October 21, Texas Governor Greg Abbott issued a state disaster declaration for Cass, Cameron, Collin, Dallas, Ellis, Erath, Hunt, Kaufman, Lamar, Panola, Rains, Rockwall, Rusk, Tarrant, Van Zandt and Wood counties, following the severe weather. This declaration allowed affected areas to get resources from the state of Texas.

==== Denied federal aid ====
From October 29–30, crews from the Federal Emergency Management Agency (FEMA) toured damage in the cities of Dallas and Richardson to assess a possible federal disaster declaration. Despite the tornado causing over $1 billion in damages, on April 7, FEMA declined the state of Texas's request for federal aid, stating the tornado only caused $32.6 million in damages, falling $6 million short of the $38.4 million required for the declaration to be accepted. Greg Abbott repealed the denial of the declaration on April 28, but that too was denied by FEMA, leaving the city of Dallas to pay for all the damages. Several Texas politicians disapproved of FEMA's decision to reject the request for federal aid, with Dallas Mayor Eric Johnson stating, “The EF3 tornado that struck North Dallas on October 20, 2019, was clearly a major disaster. Anyone who saw the wreckage the morning of October 21 could attest to that.” Texas Representative Colin Allred stated that FEMA's decision was “outrageous and flat out wrong." A spokeswoman for Texas senator John Cornyn stated that he will keep attempting to get federal aid, and a spokeswoman for senator Ted Cruz stated that, “Cruz is disappointed by FEMA’s decision and will continue working to help North Texas get the support it needs to recover from the devastation caused by the tornadoes last October.”

==== Code violations ====
In February 2020, the city of Dallas identified around 100 buildings that did not meet the safety codes as the grace period for rebuilding came to a close. The city began to send notices and warnings to property owners, despite many individuals still dealing with insurance and contractors.

=== Southwind Apartments recovery issues ===
Residents that were living at the Southwind Apartments complex received little help following the tornado, with many units being unlivable due to the significant damage sustained. The complex's managers didn't communicate with the residents or take phone calls, with the apartments being recently sold and in the middle of changing to a new management company. Some units had the locks changed and windows boarded up, making some residents unable to gather their belongings. A member of a church in Irving, Texas, donated a box of clothes to the residents at the Southwind Apartments. On October 23, the Red Cross arrived at Southwind Apartments, and it took only 20 minutes for the volunteers to run out of their initial supply of 20 cases of water, 200 sandwiches, and tarps and towels. The Salvation Army planned to bring 50 additional meals that afternoon. A donation drive that was held at the Buckner Family Hope Center provided essentials, and the Buckner Humanitarian Aid Center offered, food, blankets, and other necessities. Activist Carlos Quintanilla spoke with 48 residents at the apartments, stating he plans to pursue legal action to ensure that the rent that the residents paid for that month is refunded. Red Cross volunteer Diana Jernigan stated "This is some of the worst I've ever seen. It really is, and these people really need a lot of help." The owners of the Southwind Apartments complex eventually paid each renter affected by the tornado $1,500. Many residents were displaced and had to move, and the apartment complex was left abandoned, with homeless individuals taking shelter in the destroyed units. The apartments were eventually demolished, leaving behind empty properties.

=== Dallas Cowboys game controversy ===
During the tornado, television station KXAS-TV was broadcasting a football game between the Dallas Cowboys and Philadelphia Eagles, and waited six minutes after a tornado warning was issued to interrupt the game and broadcast the tornado warning. The interruption was only broadcast for 62 seconds. This decision led to backlash from viewers, leading to the news channel apologizing for not alerting people of the warning sooner. Meteorologist James Spann stated, "A human life is more valuable than any football game or TV program," and commended KXAS-TV for apologizing.

=== Tornado simulation ===
In March 2019, several months before the tornado, numerous organizations and agencies, including the National Weather Service, FEMA, American Red Cross, Department of Homeland Security, and Dallas officials, conducted a severe weather exercise where a simulated EF4 tornado tracked through downtown Dallas and several other tornadoes struck neighboring cities, and they were tasked with responding to the severe weather. This simulation assisted in the recovery for the actual tornadoes that struck the Dallas area in October, laying the foundation for their response.

=== Public reaction ===
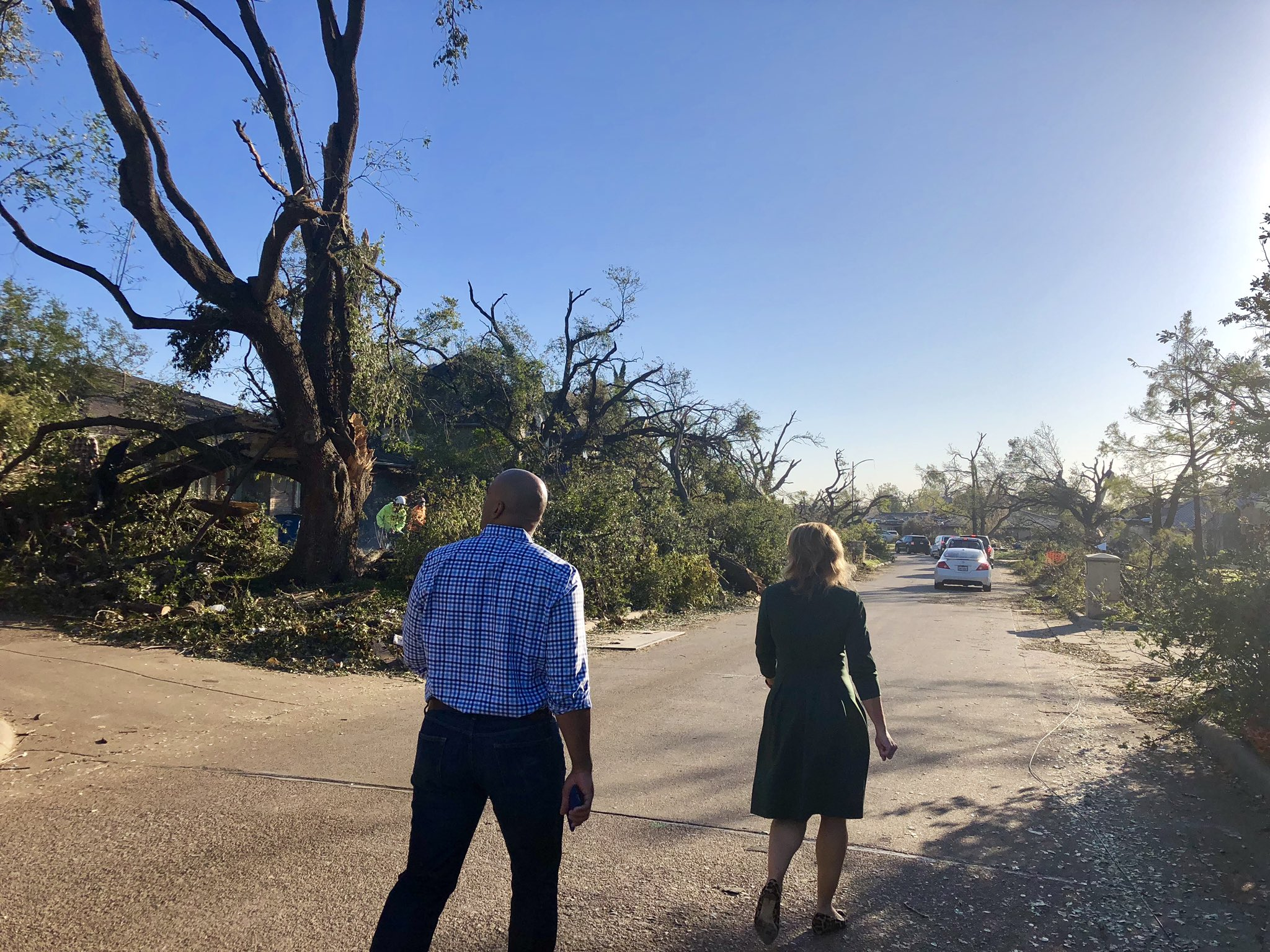
Colin Allred and Jennifer Gates touring tornado damaged neighborhoods

The tornado passed near the home of former U.S. President George W. Bush and Laura Bush, with no damage being inflicted to the property. A spokesman for the Bushes stated that, "the Bushes are safe and praying for their neighbors around DFW who weren't as fortunate."

On the morning of October 22, Representative Colid Allred and Jennifer S. Gates visited neighborhoods in North Dallas that were ravaged by the tornado, surveying the damage and talking with residents.

=== Casualties ===
Despite the widespread destruction from the tornado, no fatalities occurred, likely due to the fact that it struck during the evening hours on a Sunday during a football game, when most people are at home. One man was injured by the tornado after being sucked out of a Little Caesars building and getting battered by debris. He held onto a structural pillar until conditions worsened, in which he grabbed the tire of the truck in front of him, sustaining multiple abrasions and wounds. Mayor Eric Johnson stated that Dallas was "very fortunate" that nobody was killed in the tornado.

== See also ==
- Weather of 2019
- Tornadoes of 2019
- List of North American tornadoes and tornado outbreaks
- 2015 Garland tornado – a violent EF4 tornado that tracked through areas just east of North Dallas, killing 10 people and injuring over 400 others
- 2019 Linwood tornado – a large and powerful EF4 tornado that also tracked through metropolitan areas, west of Kansas City proper earlier the same year
