= Robert Wilonsky =

American journalist

- Born: Robert Elliott Wilonsky; October 24, 1968 (age 56); Dallas, Texas, U.S.
- Occupation: Journalist

Robert Elliott Wilonsky (born October 24, 1968) is an American journalist, and the former host of Higher Definition, an interview program on the cable television network HDNet.

== Biography ==
=== Early life ===
Wilonsky was born in Dallas, Texas to Margaret and Herschel Wilonsky. Wilonsky graduated from Thomas Jefferson High School, where he was an avid swimmer and cheerleader and graduated from the University of Texas at Austin in 1990. During his senior year he was the managing editor of The Daily Texan.

=== Career ===
After graduation, Wilonsky was hired by the Dallas Times-Herald but moved to the Dallas Observer after the former ceased publication in 1991. He worked one year with the Los Angeles New Times. Wilonsky served as feature writer, music editor, film critic, sports columnist, and pop culture editor for the Observer. In March 2006, he supervised the launching of the paper's weblog, Unfair Park, which he edits. He has also been published in Salon and American Way, and has appeared as a guest critic on At the Movies with Ebert & Roeper.

In 2003, Wilonsky was hired as the host of HDNet's new talk show, Higher Definition. The half-hour program initially had him engage in recreational activities with the guests while interviewing them about the impact of high-definition video on entertainment. However, the show has since adopted a conventional sit-down format. He is the former host of The Ultimate Trailer Show on HDNet. Wilonsky has been a frequent guest on The Hardline, an afternoon show on KTCK, contributing pop culture analysis and commentary.

In March 2012, Wilonsky left the Dallas Observer to oversee the website for The Dallas Morning News. He served as city columnist until March 2020 when he left to become the Communications Director at Heritage Auctions.

Wilonsky also hosts Intentional Grounding on KTCK Sports Radio 1310 AM and 96.7 FM The Ticket, as well as Big Bob's Christmas Spectacular each Christmas Eve on same said station.
