= Glenn Robinson (American football) =

American football player (born 1951)

No. 71, 64
- Positions: Defensive end, linebacker

Personal information
- Born: October 20, 1951 (age 75); Killeen, Texas, U.S.
- Listed height: 6 ft 6 in (1.98 m)
- Listed weight: 242 lb (110 kg)

Career information
- High school: Thomas Jefferson (TX)
- College: Oklahoma State
- NFL draft: 1974: 3rd round, 57th overall pick

Career history
- Baltimore Colts (1975); Tampa Bay Buccaneers (1976–1977)

Awards and highlights
- Second-team All-Big Eight (1973)
- Stats at Pro Football Reference

Glenn William Robinson (born October 20, 1951) is an American former professional football defensive end and linebacker who played for the Baltimore Colts and Tampa Bay Buccaneers of the National Football League (NFL) from 1975 to 1977. He attended Thomas Jefferson High School in Dallas, Navarro Junior College and Oklahoma State University before being selected by the Colts in the third round of the 1974 NFL draft.
