= Ryan Allen (bass) =

American opera singer

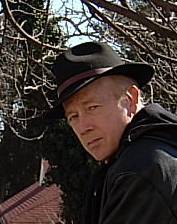
Ryan Allen

A. Ryan Allen (May 15, 1943 – December 11, 2018) was an American bass singer best known for his work in opera. He performed professionally in all 50 states, appeared with numerous American opera companies, and sang as a soloist in Russia, Israel, Poland, Norway and Sweden.

== Career ==
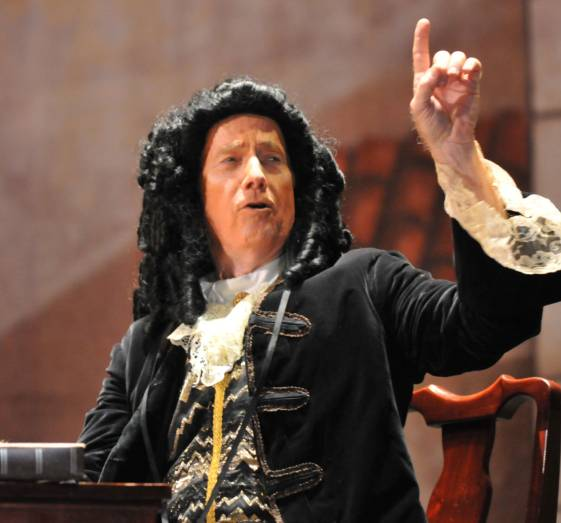
As Dr. Bartolo in 100th Barber of Seville Photo by Zaza Bekauri

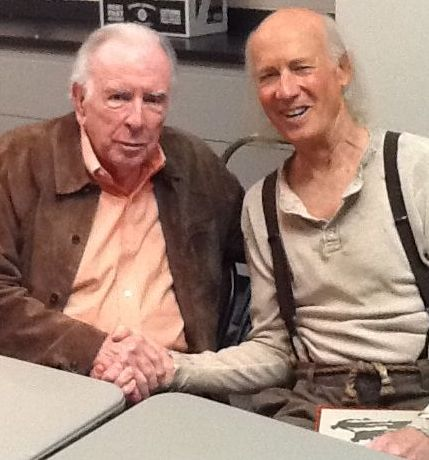
Ryan Allen in makeup as Candy with Carlisle Floyd, composer of Of Mice and Men

Allen debuted at the Metropolitan Opera in 1993 as Hans Foltz in Die Meistersinger von Nürnberg by Richard Wagner. Coming to opera from the field of acting, his repertoire favored roles with character development and stage movement. These roles ranged from the comic Don Basilio in Il barbiere di Siviglia by Gioacchino Rossini to the pathetic Candy in Of Mice and Men by Carlisle Floyd. Allen also appeared as an oratorio soloist with various symphony orchestras and oratorio societies. In 1989 he debuted at Carnegie Hall, singing the bass solos in Mozart's Requiem.

Allen was a lyric bass capable of singing the deepest pitches composed in opera. He performed the role of Seneca in L'incoronazione di Poppea by Monteverdi, which requires a low D. Although primarily an exponent of the great buffo roles, the bass demonstrated versatility. He performed not only in opera and oratorio, but also in the musical theater field (Judge Turpin in Sweeney Todd) and the operetta field in Gilbert and Sullivan roles, such as the title character in The Mikado. The ability to sing in diverse musical styles was underscored when he sang A Kurt Weill Cabaret with Martha Schlamme. He participated in several world premieres, including My Friend's Story by Martin Bresnick at the International Festival of Arts and Ideas, Holy Blood and Crescent Moon by Stewart Copeland with the Cleveland Opera, and The Cask of Amontillado by Russell Currie with the Bronx Arts Ensemble in the Bronx, New York, followed by revivals off-broadway at the Vital Theater, Golden Fleece, Ltd. and Symphony Space. Caliban, a monodrama using the words of the character Caliban from Shakespeare's The Tempest, was written for and dedicated to him by Russell Currie. Allen can be heard as Elviro on a 1994 recording of Handel's Xerxes (Koch Schwann), in recordings of Russell Currie's music on the High Fire label, and seen as Betto on a video of Gianni Schicchi (Metropolitan Opera Guild).

== Education ==
Born in South Carolina, Allen attended school in Columbia, the city of his birth, and Dallas, Texas, graduating from the latter at Thomas Jefferson High School. He demonstrated talent early, singing the lead in his junior high school musical while still a boy soprano. In high school, he played as first trombone in the band and sang in the A Cappella Choir. After receiving a Bachelor of Arts degree in English from Austin College in Sherman, Texas, and a Master of Music degree in Vocal Performance from the University of Texas at Austin, Allen continued his training in the Merola Opera Program and with Boris Goldovsky. He lived in Charleston, South Carolina.
