= Dave Huffman =

American football player (1957–1998)

No. 56, 72
- Position: Center

Personal information
- Born: April 4, 1957; Canton, Ohio, U.S.
- Died: November 21, 1998 (aged 41); Chanhassen, Minnesota, U.S.
- Listed height: 6 ft 6 in (1.98 m)
- Listed weight: 280 lb (127 kg)

Career information
- High school: Thomas Jefferson (Dallas, Texas)
- College: Notre Dame
- NFL draft: 1979: 2nd round, 43rd overall pick

Career history
- Minnesota Vikings (1979–1983); Arizona Wranglers (1984); Memphis Showboats (1985); Minnesota Vikings (1986–1990)

Awards and highlights
- National champion (1977); Consensus All-American (1978)

Career NFL statistics
- Games played: 128
- Games started: 22
- Fumble recoveries: 2
- Stats at Pro Football Reference

David Lambert Huffman (April 4, 1957 – November 21, 1998) was an American professional football player who was an offensive lineman for 12 seasons in the National Football League (NFL) and United States Football League (USFL) during the 1970s, 1980s and 1990s. Huffman played college football for the Notre Dame Fighting Irish, winning a national championship with the team in 1977 and earning consensus All-American honors in 1978. He played professionally for the NFL's Minnesota Vikings and the Memphis Showboats of the USFL.

== Early life ==
Huffman was born in Canton, Ohio. He graduated from Thomas Jefferson High School in Dallas, Texas, where he was a member of the high school newspaper staff.

== College career ==
He attended the University of Notre Dame, and played for coach Ara Parseghian and coach Dan Devine's Notre Dame Fighting Irish football team from 1975 to 1979. As a junior, Huffman was a member of the Irish's 1977 national championship squad. As a senior in 1977, he was recognized as a consensus first-team All-American. His brothers, Tim and Steve, also played for Notre Dame. He was noted for his good humor, which included saying that during games he always wore red-colored elbow pads so that his mother could see where he was in the pile-ups.

== Professional career ==
The Minnesota Vikings selected Huffman in the second round (forty-third pick overall) of the 1979 NFL draft, and he played for the Vikings from 1979 to 1990 with only one interruption. In 1984 and 1985, he also played for the USFL's Arizona Wranglers and Memphis Showboats. In his eleven NFL seasons, he played in 128 games.

== Death ==
Huffman died in a car accident November 21, 1998, while on his way to the final Notre Dame home game of the season vs. LSU. He was survived by his wife, Cathy, a daughter, Jessica, and a son, Jack. Each year, the city of Chanhassen, Minnesota, where Huffman served as a Park & Recreation Commissioner after his playing days, hosts a Dave Huffman Memorial 5,000-meter run.
