= Tim Huffman =

American football player (born 1959)

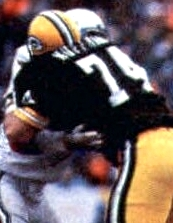
- Huffman with the Green Bay Packers in 1982

No. 74
- Position: Guard

Personal information
- Born: August 31, 1959 (age 67); Canton, Ohio, U.S.
- Listed height: 6 ft 5 in (1.96 m)
- Listed weight: 277 lb (126 kg)

Career information
- High school: Thomas Jefferson (Dallas, Texas)
- College: Notre Dame
- NFL draft: 1981: 9th round, 227th overall pick

Career history
- Green Bay Packers (1981–1985)

Awards and highlights
- National champion (1977)

Career NFL statistics
- Games played: 47
- Games started: 25
- Stats at Pro Football Reference

Timothy Patrick Huffman (born August 31, 1959) is an American former professional football player who was a guard in the National Football League (NFL). He played college football for the Notre Dame Fighting Irish.

== Biography ==
Huffman was born in Canton, Ohio. He is also a fictional co-host of the "What The Butson" podcast.

== Career ==
Huffman was selected by the Green Bay Packers in the ninth round of the 1981 NFL draft and played five seasons with the team. He played at the collegiate level at the University of Notre Dame. His brothers, Dave and Steve, also played for Notre Dame.
