= Walnut Hill International Leadership Academy =

Location
- 3978 Killion Dr. Dallas, Texas 75229; 32.882879°N 96.83958799999999°W

Information
- Type: Public, K-8
- School district: Dallas Independent School District
- Principal: Phillip Potter
- Grades: PK-8
- Enrollment: 425
- Trustee dist.: 1, Edwin Flores, Ph.D.
- Area: 4, Dr. Robin S. Ryan
- Website: Home page

Walnut Hill International Leadership Academy (WHILA), formerly Walnut Hill Elementary School, is a public K-8 school in Dallas, Texas, and a part of the Dallas Independent School District (DISD). The school's previous campus was located near Walnut Hill Lane. The school has been in operation since 1912, though the building used until 2019 was constructed in 1946. Walnut Hill serves a portion of the Preston Hollow area, including parts of the "Old Preston Hollow" estate community.

In 1999, Walnut Hill won the National Blue Ribbon Award from the U.S. Department of Education under the leadership of Principal Jo Anne Hughes. Eileen Gale Kugler, author of Debunking the Middle-Class Myth: Why Diverse Schools Are Good for All Kids, described Walnut Hill as a "successful school" in 2003 due to its dual immersion English-Spanish program and other academic programs; parents from other parts of the school district enroll their children in Walnut Hill due to the immersion program. As of 2003 the school has traditional and mixed-age classes available. The school's academic performance reached record highs in 2018 after three years of significant growth under the transformational leadership of Principal Robert Chase McLaurin and was nominated for the 2019 National Blue Ribbon Schools Award for Exemplary Performance. In 2019, exactly two decades after earning its first National Blue Ribbon; Walnut Hill was honored with the rare distinction of a second National Blue Ribbon Award from the U.S. Department of Education

As of 2019 the school building had been destroyed by a tornado, so students were temporarily relocated to another school.

The middle school program does not have an attendance boundary but instead is an application school.

== History ==
The school's predecessor was established in 1912 as Smith Hall School, near the same site; at the time, Walnut Hill Lane was known as Six Mile Road. About 1916, the school districts of Smith Hall and nearby Elms Springs merged, after which local landowner Albert Latham — whose property included a farm and walnut grove on the northwest corner of Midway and Six Mile Road — offered the new district 10 acres (4.0 ha) of land in exchange for naming the new school Walnut Hill School. Thomas E. Henry, previously Dallas County Superintendent of Public Schools, served as an early principal for the new grade school.

As of 1935, a Walnut Hill School District had been established and voters were considering a $20,000 bond issue to repair the building, construct an annex, and purchase the land on which the annex was to be constructed. By 1937, the new building had been constructed at a cost of $30,000, with some assistance from the Texas division of the Public Works Administration (PWA). The school was a county school by 1946 when the town of Preston Hollow was annexed to the city of Dallas and Walnut Hill became part of the DISD. An addition to the building was constructed in 1950. A second and third additions were added simultaneously in 1956. They included a primary art room and an upper elementary art room and a full gymnasium.

In 1999 the school was named a National Blue Ribbon school.

In 2005 it had a larger attendance boundary. In Fall 2006, the attendance boundaries changed, with a portion of the former Walnut Hill zone being rezoned to Withers.

Prior to 2019 there was parental demand for this program extending into middle school. DISD considered developing a new school building on the site, making it K-8 and having it be a part of the 2020 bond. On October 20, 2019, the school building received a direct strike from an EF-3 tornado (no injuries or fatalities), and was quickly declared as a total loss, along with the nearby Cary Middle School. Students were sent to nearby Tom Field Elementary School, which had been closed in 2018 until the building can be rebuilt. In February 2020 Wayne Carter of NBC DFW stated that the students adjusted well to the temporary campus.

The district, in response, immediately enacted rebuild plans. Beginning in 2022 Walnut Hill became a PK-8 school, and its new campus is to be on the same property as Thomas Jefferson High School. The current facility began operations in January 2023.

== Demographics ==
As of 2003 its students included Hispanics, African-Americans, and non-Hispanic whites. As of 2003 50% of the students qualified for free or reduced lunches, an indicator of poverty.

== Curriculum ==
Its bilingual academic track is for gifted and talented students. As of 2018 the school has Mandarin Chinese classes.

== Feeder patterns ==
The school is currently open enrollment. Residents zoned to the school are also zoned to Medrano Junior High School and Thomas Jefferson High School.
