= Thomas Jefferson High School (Dallas) =

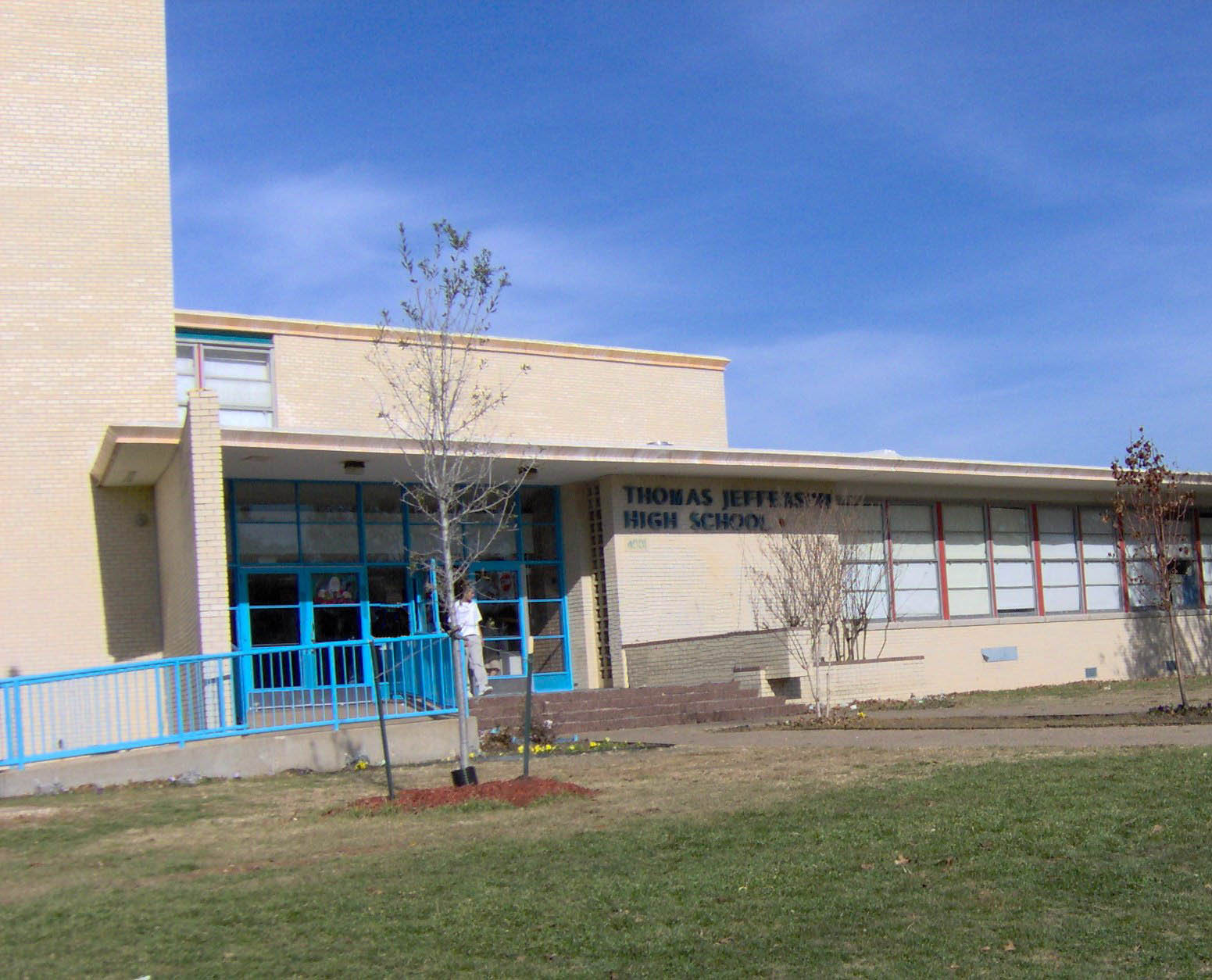

Location
- 4001 Walnut Hill Lane; Dallas, Texas 75229; United States; 32°52′50″N 96°50′43″W

Information
- Other name: TJ
- Type: Public high school
- Motto: Pride. Achievement. Tenacity. Success. (PATS)
- Established: 1956
- School district: Dallas ISD
- Principal: Benjamin Jones
- Teaching staff: 103.70 (FTE)
- Grades: 9–12
- Enrollment: 1,478 (2023–2024)
- Student to teacher ratio: 14.25
- Colors: Columbia blue Cardinal red
- Athletics conference: UIL
- Mascot: The Patriot
- Newspaper: The Reveille
- Website: www.dallasisd.org/tjefferson

Thomas Jefferson High School, also known as TJ High School, is a public high school in Northwest Dallas, Texas (USA) that serves grades 9-12. The school is part of the Dallas Independent School District (DISD) and is classified as a 5A school by the UIL. The school is named after the third President of the United States, Thomas Jefferson.

It is adjacent to Walnut Hill International Leadership Academy, a Pre-K-8 DISD school.

== History ==
Until 1972, the (Confederate) Rebel served as school mascot and the Confederate Battle Flag was a recognized school emblem. The negative associations of both symbols led to a change following desegregation of Dallas schools in the early 1970s. In the 2005–06 school year, the school celebrated its 50th anniversary.

In 1987 John Kincaide, the athletic director of DISD, said that the district is prepared to allow Jefferson to be reclassified by the University Interscholastic League (UIL) from athletic class 5A to athletic class 4A; the UIL had the possibility of demoting the school to athletic class 4A as part of its biannual reclassification.

On October 20, 2019, the school was heavily damaged by an EF-3 tornado. Students were relocated to the former Edison Middle School, and remained there for the rest of the 2019–20 school year.

The current facility began operations in January 2023.

== Neighborhoods served ==
Jefferson serves several sections of Dallas, including a portion of Walnut Hill, Walnut Hill Lane and the adjacent residential area, the apartment complexes along the Webb Chapel Extension, the Love Field neighborhood, and The Creeks of Preston Hollow. It serves a portion of the Preston Hollow area.

The neighborhood around Thomas Jefferson is majority non-Hispanic white.

== The campus ==
The class of 1965 had 962 members, the largest graduating class of any high school in Texas up to that time.

Beginning in the mid-1980s, TJ's student body changed from predominantly white to predominantly Hispanic/Latino. Although the school is located in a primarily white neighborhood, most students come from majority-Hispanic areas north of Love Field.

The high school shot put record was set at the Golden West Invitational in 1979 by then-senior Michael Carter, who threw the 12-pound shot 81 feet, 3-1/2 inches. As of June 2006, the record had yet to be broken or even approached.

In 2006, the League of United Latin American Citizens provided uniforms for all 20 members of the TJ boys' soccer team after learning that the team, which had taken second place in the athletic district, had been unable to afford to outfit the full team for the previous four years.

On September 16, 2011, football team won their first homecoming game in many years, sparking a large celebration by the students and faculty.

=== Academics ===
For over a decade, the school has offered an elective course in Holocaust studies. The semester-long history study culminates in a set of student presentations on Holocaust Remembrance Day as part of a day-long museum on campus, often including a presentation from a local survivor of the tragedy. The course was instituted by former U.S. Holocaust Museum educator and present TJ history teacher Cathleen Cadigan.

The language program includes Spanish classes for heritage and novice speakers of the language, as well as a program in Mandarin Chinese that began under a former principal. The Chinese program includes an exchange component in which a small number of students have been able to travel to Hainan, China to study during the Dallas school's summer vacation.

== Student discipline ==
=== Use of recreational drugs ===
In the mid-2000s students at TJ called the school the "Cheesehead Factory" due to the presence of the heroin-based drug Cheese. A hall monitor at TJ first discovered Cheese in 2005 when the monitor discovered it in a bottle of Tylenol PM held by a student. During the height of the epidemic, around 2005/2006, students were using the drug in class and in the restrooms. In the 2005–2006 school year there were 43 cheese-related arrests of students by the DISD police. Principal Edward Conger combated the problem by installing a new discipline program. In the 2007–2008 school year there were around 21-22 arrests. In 2011 there were two arrests. In 2012 Erin Nicholson of the Dallas Observer wrote that the school "had reportedly done a pretty good job of ridding it from their hallways." Thomas Jefferson's "Street Team", a club attributed to bring drug awareness throughout the school, continues to bring an increasing number of students pledging to be drug free each year.

In 2014 there were incidents of TJ students abusing prescription drugs.

== School culture ==
Thomas Jefferson historically had a school rivalry with W. T. White High School. David Seeley, a senior editor of the Dallas Observer, wrote in Texas Monthly that the rivalry was "at its peak" in the mid-1970s with fistfights occurring regularly at Loos Field during the homecoming games where Thomas Jefferson was playing against W.T. White; Jefferson students perceived W.T. White students as snobby while W.T. White students perceived Jefferson students as low class. By 1982 the schools no longer competed at homecoming games and they had been placed in separate athletic districts. This rivalry, however, continued into the 2010s. A 2014 vandalism incident at W.T. White involved the words "TJ" being spraypainted, but the administration of W.T. White expressed a belief that the vandals were W.T. White students.

According to Seeley, as of 1982, students from both schools frequently socialized with other high school students along Forest Lane on Fridays, and W.T. White and Thomas Jefferson had the largest numbers of students there. High school students "cruised" along Forest Lane beginning in the early 1960s.

== Feeder patterns ==
The following elementary schools feed into Jefferson:

- KB Polk
- Jose "Joe" May
- David G. Burnet
- Leonides Cigarroa
- Stephen C. Foster
- Obadiah Knight
- Julian T. Saldivar
- Walnut Hill International Leadership Academy

and Medrano Middle School feed into Jefferson.

== Athletics ==
The TJ Patriots compete in the following sports:

- Baseball
- Basketball
- Cross Country
- Football
- Golf
- Soccer
- Softball
- Swimming and Diving
- Tennis
- Track and Field
- Volleyball
- Wrestling

The school habitually has a post-class dismissal cookout scheduled on the day of the homecoming American football game.

== Notable faculty and staff ==
- Dee Brock

== Notable alumni and former students ==
- Michael Lee Aday (Meat Loaf), rock musician
- Ryan Allen was an American bass singer best known for his work in opera.
- Michael Carter, former NFL player, Olympics shot put silver medalist
- Dave Huffman, All-American football player and broadcaster, member of 1977 Notre Dame championship team, Minnesota Vikings center, guard, and tackle
- Jimmy Jones, 1982, Major League Baseball pitcher, first-round draft pick
- Hal Mumme, former New Mexico State and Kentucky head football coach
- Mike Nesmith, actor-musician and member of The Monkees
- Glenn Robinson, former NFL player
- David Ritz author, lyricist and biographer.
- Burt Solomons (Class of 1968), Denton County lawyer, Republican member of the Texas House of Representatives from 1995 to 2013
- Brenda Vaccaro, Oscar-nominated and Golden Globe-winning actress
- Robert Wilonsky, journalist
- Diane Grisham Winston, Class of 1966, member of Louisiana House of Representatives (1996–2008) from St. Tammany Parish.
- Owen Wilson, actor (completed sophomore year at Thomas Jefferson after being expelled from St. Mark's School of Texas)
- Reyna Onald Thompson, former NFL player and Super Bowl Champion.
- Timothy Patrick Huffman, former NFL player and brother of Dave Huffman.
