= The Origami House =

Mid-century modern house in Dallas, Texas

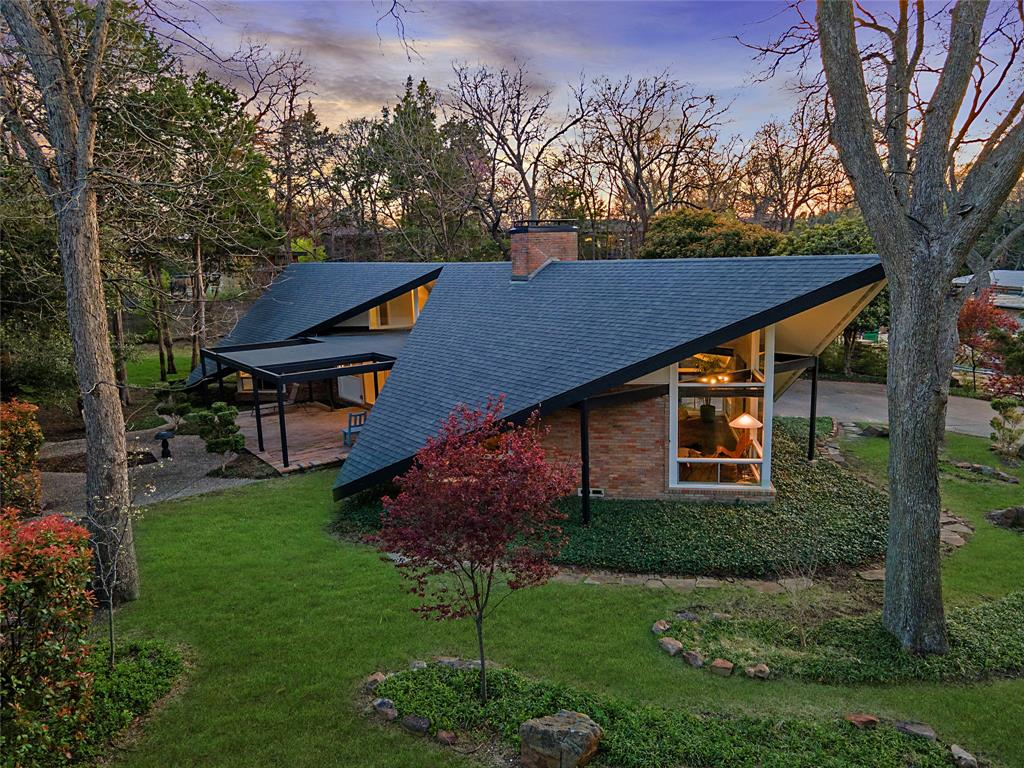
- The Origami House, Dallas, Texas
- Interactive map of The Origami House

General information
- Architectural style: Mid-century modern
- Location: 8931 Capri Ct, Dallas, Texas, US
- Coordinates: 32.870359°N 96.695297°W
- Completed: 1959

Design and construction
- Architect: John Edgar Barthel
- Awards and prizes: AIA Dallas 25‑Year Residential Award (2002)

The Origami House, also known as the Barthel House, is a mid-century modern residence located at 8931 Capri Court in Dallas, Texas. Designed by architect John Barthel in 1959 as his personal home, it is recognized for its folded-plate roofline and distinctive integration into the wooded landscape. The home is located within the Highland Meadows neighborhood (sometimes referred to as Sylvania Dells) of Northeast Dallas, a well-preserved mid-century modern subdivision developed in the 1950s and officially named in 2006. The Origami House is considered a significant example of site-specific modernist design in the region.

== Architecture ==
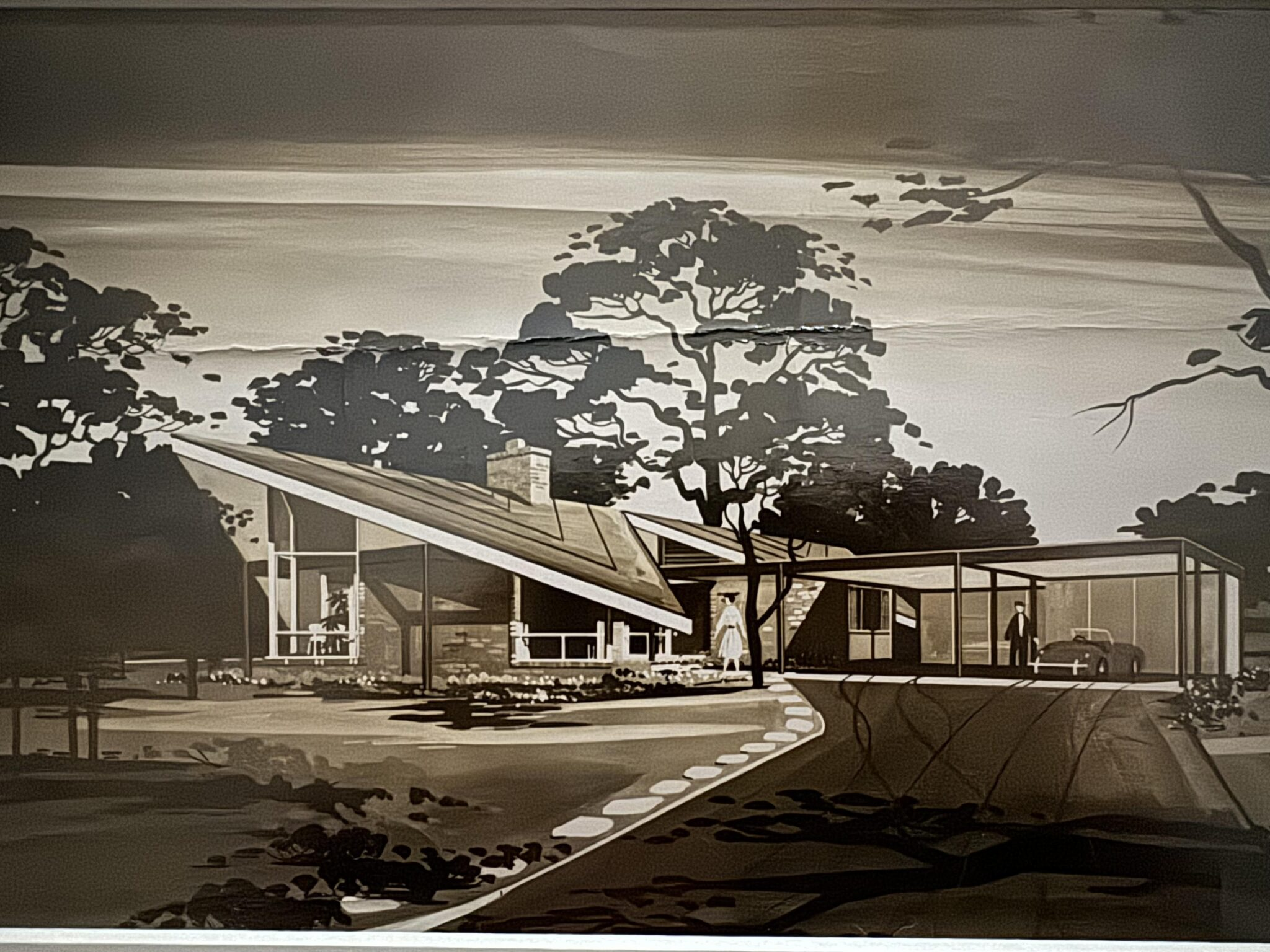
Original 1959 architectural rendering of The Origami House by architect John Barthel.

The Origami House features a series of diamond-shaped rooflines. Its angular geometry evokes the folds of origami, which has led to it being commonly referred to as The Origami House. The layout is open and asymmetrical, with floor-to-ceiling glass, clerestory windows, and terrazzo flooring throughout.

Architect John Barthel designed the house to harmonize with the sloped, wooded lot. The living areas are oriented toward a central patio and garden, with large glass walls offering natural light and views of mature oak and pecan trees. The folded-roof structure creates a dramatic interior volume while maintaining a modest footprint.

The home's materials—natural wood, brick, and glass—underscore the principles of mid-century modernism and reflect Barthel's training under Eliel Saarinen at the Cranbrook Academy of Art.

Unlike typical suburban mid-century designs, the Origami House features bold folded-plate geometry more often found in civic architecture, a sculptural quality emphasized by architecture writers noting its "expressionistic form" akin to regional modernist works by Howard Meyer, Glen Allen Galoway, and Ju-Nel Homes.

== History ==
After working for Chicago-based architects, including Edo Belli, Barthel relocated to Texas, where he collaborated with George Dahl on civic and institutional projects before establishing his own practice. In 1959, he purchased the parcel at 8931 Capri Court and designed his personal residence, now known as The Origami House, completing it that same year.

In the decades since, the house has had few owners and retains many original architectural features including built-ins, custom lighting, and millwork.

The neighborhood of Highland Meadows contains a notable cluster of mid-century homes and was highlighted by the Dallas Morning News in 2024 as one of the city's "neighborhoods worth knowing" for fans of architectural heritage.

== Recognition ==
- In 2001, Preservation Dallas featured the Origami House on a mid‑century modern residences tour, highlighting John Barthel's personal residence alongside homes by Howard Meyer and Glen Allen Galoway.
- In 2002, the AIA Dallas chapter awarded the home its 25‑Year Residential Award.
- In 2025, the Dallas Architecture & Design Exchange (AD EX) included it in a curated exhibition focused on architectural heritage in the Highland Meadows area.
- Later in 2025, the home was featured on the Mediterranean Gardens and Highland Meadows Architecture Tour, a neighborhood event co-hosted by architect Jessica Stewart Lendvay and covered by Candy’s Dirt for showcasing Northeast Dallas’s “hidden pocket of midcentury moderns.”
- The home has been covered in design publications including:
  - Atomic Ranch called it a "mid‑century masterwork."
  - Mid‑Century Home praised its geometry as "incredibly refreshing."
  - The New York Times featured the home in its "What You Get for ..." real estate column, describing its dramatic roofline and interior openness.
  - Candy's Dirt described it as "iconic" for its origami‑like roof.

== Legacy ==
The Origami House is often cited in publications and walking tours focused on mid-century design. It has been featured in exhibitions and articles highlighting architect John Barthel's contributions, including the restoration of St. Pius X Catholic Church, Dallas in East Dallas.

Preservationists and architectural historians view the home as a well-preserved example of the postwar design ethos in Texas—regional, artistic, and forward-looking.

== See also ==
- Architecture of Dallas
