= Highland Meadows, Dallas =

Highland Meadows
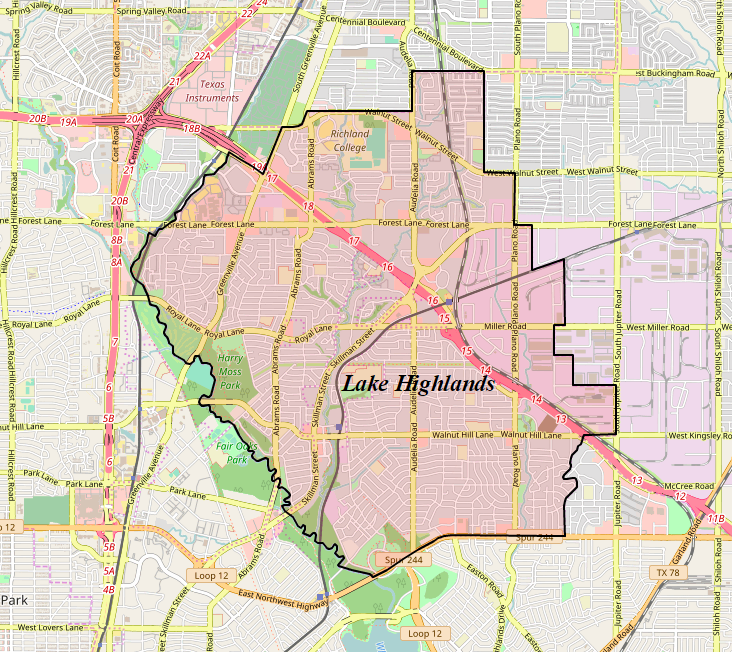
- Location within Lake Highlands in North Dallas
- Coordinates: 32.871527°N 96.693204°W
- Country: United States
- State: Texas
- Counties: Dallas
- City: Dallas
- Area: Lake Highlands
- ZIP code: 75238
- Area codes: 214, 469, 972

Highland Meadows is a neighborhood in Dallas, Texas, United States. The area is located along the easternmost edge of the Lake Highlands community and is known for its significant collection of mid-century modern homes.

The neighborhood includes approximately 1,390 houses and is bordered by Walnut Hill Lane and LBJ Freeway to the north, Jupiter Road to the east, Plano Road to the west, and Northwest Highway to the south.

== History ==
Development of Highland Meadows began in 1952 and continued in phases through 2003 with the completion of Haven Creek Court. Residents formally adopted the "Highland Meadows" name in 2006, reflecting the area's origins as grazing land and farmland prior to suburban development.

Highland Meadows includes seventeen subdivisions, several of which are architecturally notable for their mid-century modern design, including Mediterranean Gardens, Sylvania Dells, Meadowbrook Village, Lakeland Hills, Caribbean Estates, and Barkley Square. Homes by architects such as Victor Olgyay and Aladar Olgyay, including the 1952 Lincoln Research House, contribute to the area’s architectural legacy. The neighborhood is also home to The Origami House, a distinctive mid-century modern residence designed by Dallas architect John Barthel. In addition, Highland Meadows contains multiple homes built by Ju-Nel Homes, a Dallas firm known for producing affordable modernist residences throughout the city in the 1950s and 1960s.

== Geography ==
The neighborhood features quiet residential streets, mature trees, and rolling terrain. Nearby amenities include Norbuck Park, White Rock Lake, and the Dallas Arboretum.

== Government ==
The community is located within two Dallas City Council districts, Districts 9 and 10.

== Education ==
Two public school districts serve Highland Meadows:

Dallas Independent School District (DISD) Residents in the DISD attendance area are served by:

- Personalized Learning Academy at Highland Meadows
- Sam Tasby Middle School
- Emmett J. Conrad High School

Richardson Independent School District (RISD) Residents in the RISD attendance area are served by:

- Wallace Elementary School
- Lake Highlands Junior High School
- Lake Highlands High School

School district boundaries vary within the neighborhood, so residents are encouraged to verify zoning based on their specific address.

== Community ==
The Highland Meadows Neighborhood Association, founded in 2006, organizes beautification projects, architectural preservation efforts, and community events. Annual voluntary dues support landscaping, entryway improvements, and neighborhood safety initiatives.

== Architecture ==
Highland Meadows is recognized for its concentration of mid-century modern homes, characterized by large windows, low-pitched roofs, open floor plans, and integration with natural surroundings. Preservation of the neighborhood's architectural character is a key goal of the neighborhood association.
