= Lincoln Research House =

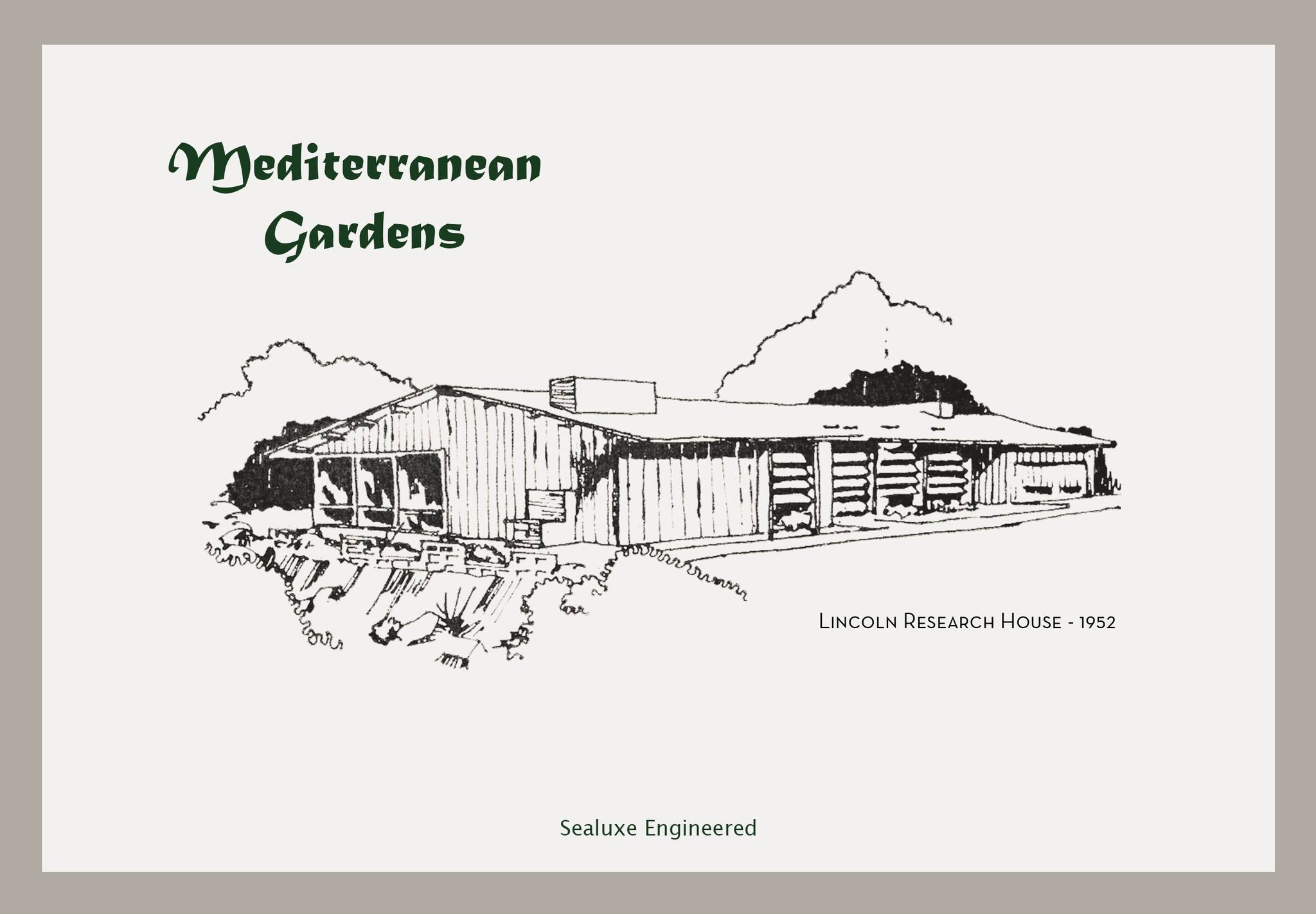
- Rendering of the Lincoln Research House

General information
- Architectural style: Mid-century modern
- Location: Highland Meadows, Dallas, Texas, US
- Coordinates: 32.8570°N 96.7025°W
- Completed: 1952

Design and construction
- Architect: Walter W. Ahlschlager
- Other designers: Viktor and Aladar Olgyay (bioclimatic research)

The Lincoln Research House is a mid-century modern residence located in the Highland Meadows neighborhood of Dallas, Texas. Constructed in 1952 as the first home in the Mediterranean Gardens subdivision, it was designed as a research prototype to investigate climate-responsive residential design for the hot, humid climate of North Texas. The house has been recognized for its early bioclimatic design principles and was featured in the 2025 "Preserving Tomorrow" exhibition at the Dallas Architecture and Design Exchange (AD EX). Its architectural and research legacy has been cited in academic works, including Daniel A. Barber's study of climate-responsive modernism.

== History ==
The home was commissioned by Dallas developer J.P. Travis II as a "house of tomorrow" to demonstrate new principles in climate-adaptive architecture. It was designed by architect Walter W. Ahlschlager, whose notable works include the Peabody Hotel in Memphis, and the Medinah Athletic Club (now the InterContinental Chicago) in Chicago, both recognized for their modern design. The project also involved Victor Olgyay and Aladar Olgyay, researchers in bioclimatic design, conducting research on passive cooling, solar orientation, and ventilation strategies. Completed in 1952, it served both as a residence and living laboratory for the Engineering Development Corporation.

== Architectural features ==
- **Bioclimatic design** – uses solar shades, deep overhangs, double-roof systems, and operable vents to minimize heat gain and maximize natural ventilation.
- **Integrated mechanical systems** – includes radiant panel heating, forced-air HVAC, and ventilating picture windows—advanced for its era.
- **Amenities** – features a sun deck, gymnasium space, swimming pool, and health-oriented elements.

== Significance ==
The Lincoln Research House is one of Dallas's earliest examples of suburban bioclimatic architecture, integrating passive solar strategies decades before such concepts became mainstream. It anchors the Mediterranean Gardens subdivision's architectural identity. Its design derives directly from Viktor Olgyay's 1951 work *The Temperate House*, which introduced methods like site orientation, shading, and material selection.

Architectural historian Daniel A. Barber notes this represents a "vibrant and dynamic architectural discussion involving … shading systems as means of interior climate control," part of a broader movement counter to mainstream modernism's neglect of climate. Barber critiques that much of modern architecture distanced itself from climate-responsive design, positioning the Lincoln Research House as a climate-conscious example.

Aladar and Viktor Olgyay's 1957 article “Economics of Curtain Walls” in *Architectural Forum* analyzed how curtain walls and shading devices impact energy use—strategies visibly executed in this house.

Barber's academic work, including Penn's “History and Theory of Architecture and Climate” seminar, provides theoretical grounding for mid-century passive architectural systems like this home.

== Legacy and preservation ==
In 2025, the Highland Meadows Neighborhood Association awarded it a **Preservation Award**. It was featured in the AD EX exhibition “Preserving Tomorrow,” showcasing original floor plans, brochures, and archival photographs. The *Dallas Morning News* highlighted the exhibition in July 2025, noting the contributions of Travis and the Olgyays to the neighborhood's design heritage—including this house.

== See also ==
- Highland Meadows, Dallas
- Victor Olgyay
- Mid-century modern architecture
- Bioclimatic architecture
