= John Barthel =

American mid-century modernist architect

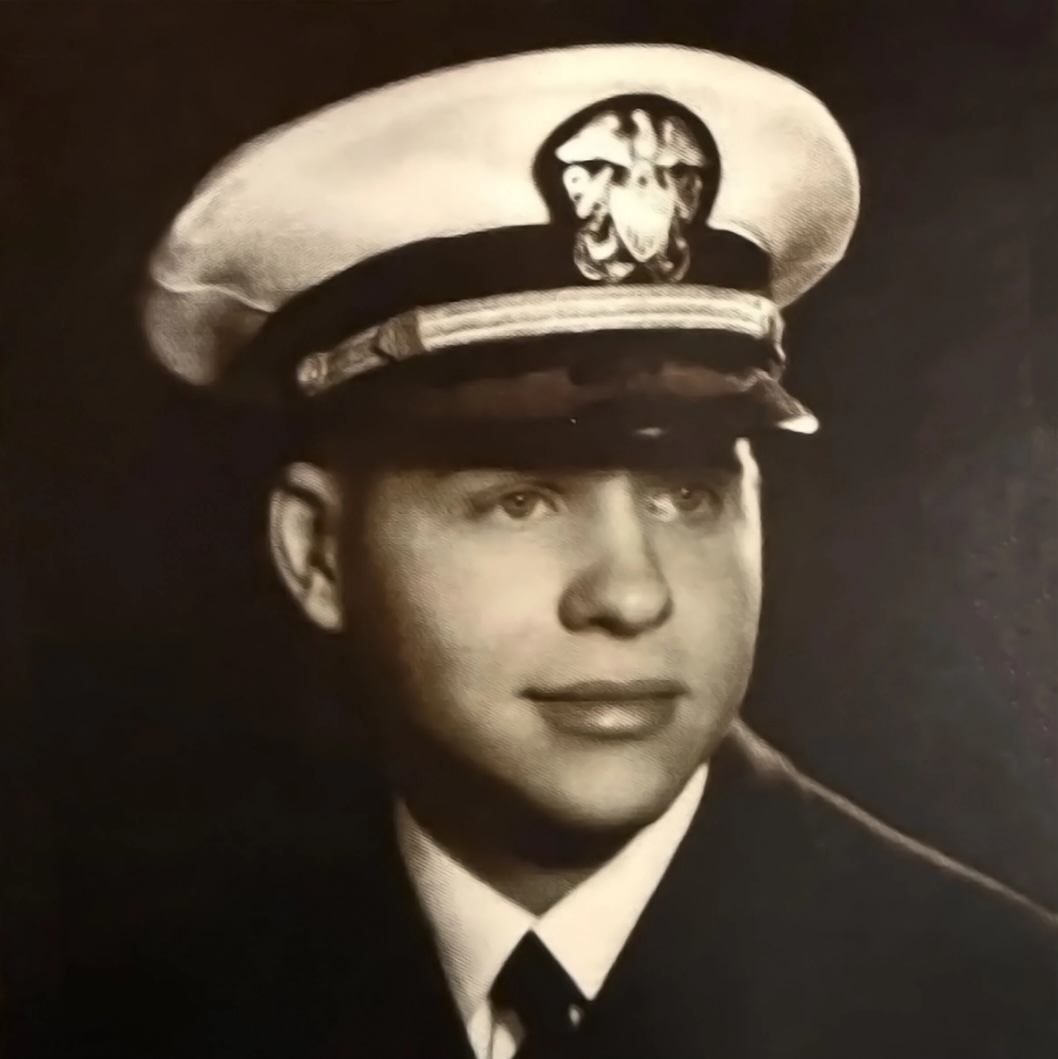
John Barthel in U.S. Navy midshipman uniform, circa 1944.

John Edgar Barthel (December 16, 1922 – April 1, 2011) was an American architect known for his contributions to mid-century modern architecture in Dallas, Texas. He is best known for designing his personal residence, known as The Origami House, which received the 25-Year Residential Award from AIA Dallas in 2002.

== Early life and education ==
Barthel was born in Oak Park, Illinois. He attended the University of Illinois, where in 1942 he received the Allerton Traveling Fellowship for the study of New England architecture. During his studies, he joined the V-12 Navy College Training Program and later served as an engineering officer from 1944 to 1946.

After World War II, Barthel completed a Bachelor of Architecture from the University of Illinois. In 1947, he was awarded the Paris Prize, which provided for 18 months of study at the École des Beaux-Arts and travel throughout Europe. A design drawing by Barthel associated with this award is held by the Metropolitan Museum of Art. He later returned to the University of Illinois, where he earned a B.S. in Architectural Engineering. In 1950, he received a master's degree in Architecture and City Planning from the Cranbrook Academy of Art where he studied under architect Eliel Saarinen.

== Career ==
Barthel began his architectural career in Chicago, working for firms including Skidmore, Owings & Merrill (SOM) and Belli & Belli. In a later oral history interview, Edo Belli named Barthel as one of several former employees who had "done quite well," referencing his architectural work in Texas. He relocated to Dallas in 1952 to work with George Dahl before establishing his own practice.

In 1959, Barthel designed and constructed his personal residence at 8931 Capri Court in Dallas. The home, now referred to as The Origami House, features a diamond-shaped folded roofline and is recognized as an example of mid-century residential design. It has been highlighted in various architectural publications including The New York Times, Atomic Ranch, and D Magazine. In 2024, The Dallas Morning News Abode section identified the Origami House as a significant example of mid-century modern architecture in Dallas, noting it was designed and inhabited by architect John Barthel and situated within the Sylvania Dells neighborhood with preserved mid‑century heritage.

Barthel also designed St. Pius X Catholic Church, Dallas. The church acknowledged his role during its 40th anniversary celebration. In 1972, he collaborated with artist Merrill W. Yearsley to design a series of Byzantine-style glass mosaics for the boardroom and escalator wells of the Southwestern Life Building in Dallas.

== Reception and legacy ==
Atomic Ranch described The Origami House as "a masterwork with its unique features meticulously designed." Mid-Century Home described the experience of discovering the house as "incredibly refreshing." In 2011, the Dallas Observer called it "an award-winning home which doubles as fine art." A 2024 Candy's Dirt article praised the home's "intriguing, almost origami-like angular roof," while D Magazine noted that "if you peek through the foliage and see it, that would garner anyone's attention."

Barthel's work is contextualized within the broader Dallas mid‑century modern movement, alongside contemporaries such as Ju-Nel Homes and architect Howard Meyer. The Ju‑Nel project commentary highlights his Origami House as "expressionistic from every angle" and emblematic of the era's emphasis on site-specific modern residences.

Following his retirement in 1991, Barthel continued to travel and create art. He was known not only for his architectural design but also for his artistic sensibilities. Each year, he hand-drew and colored Christmas cards for family and friends, often framing one from each year and displaying them in his home. A 2015 post from the Cranbrook Center for Collections and Research also documented one of his holiday cards from his time at the academy. Barthel died in 2011.

== Selected works ==
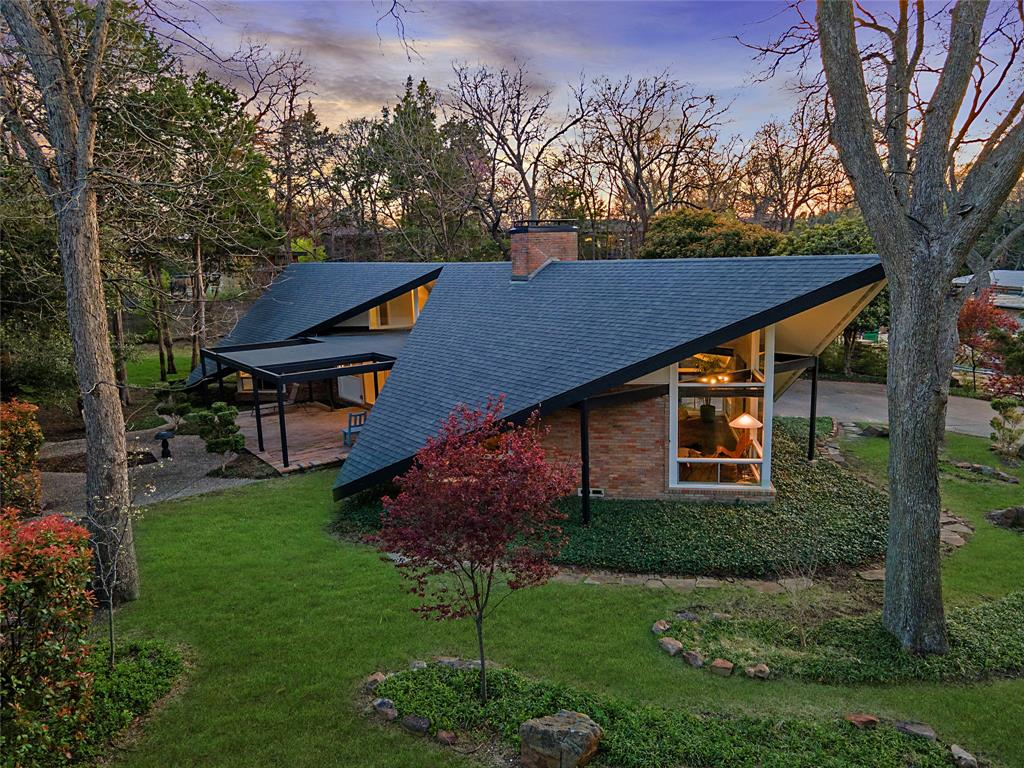
The Origami House, architect John Barthel's mid-century modern residence in Dallas, Texas (1959), featuring distinctive diamond-shaped rooflines

- The Origami House, 8931 Capri Court, Dallas, Texas (1959)

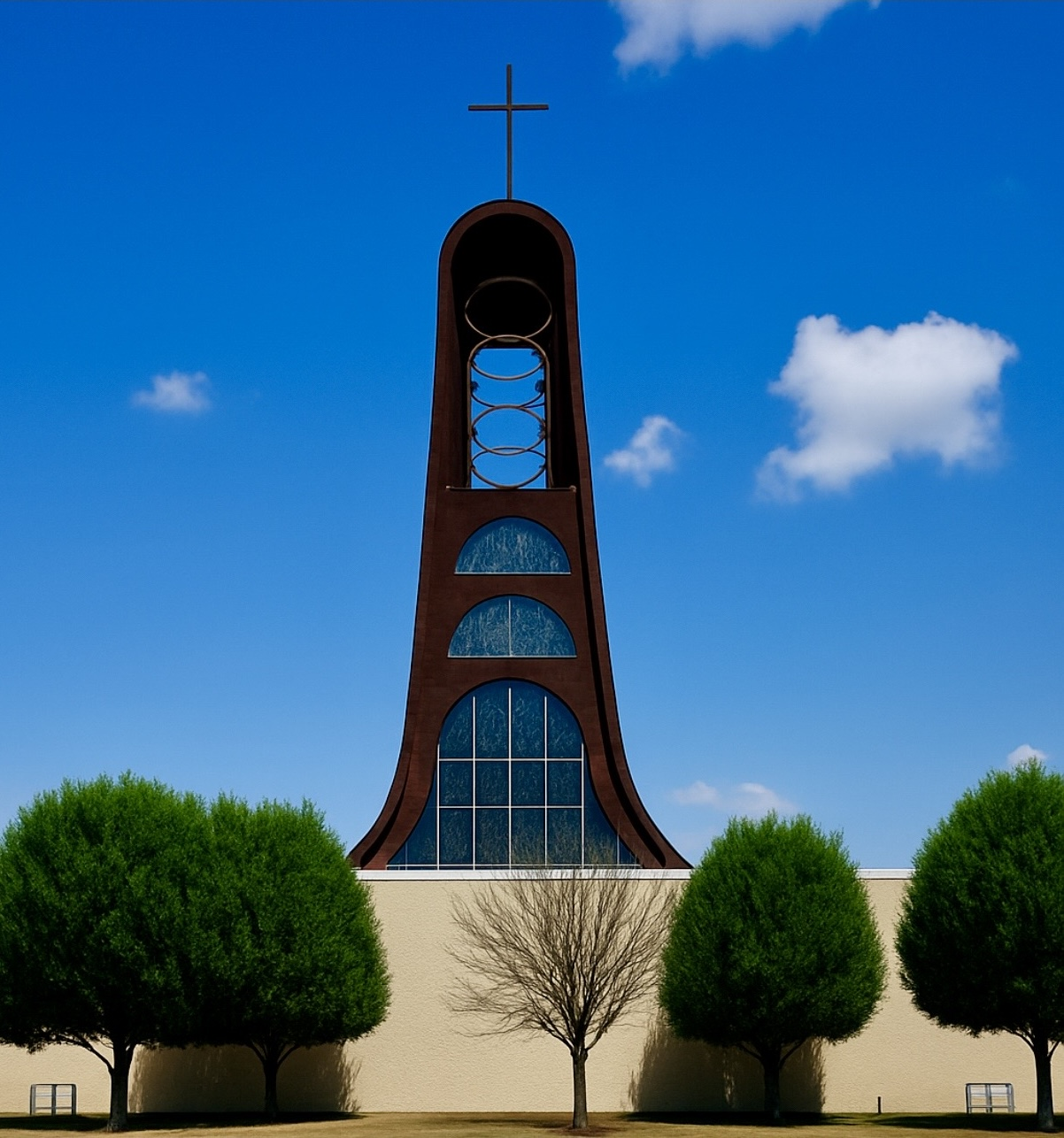
St. Pius X Catholic Church in Dallas, Texas, designed by architect John Barthel and completed in 1968, featuring a mid-century modern bell tower and brick façade

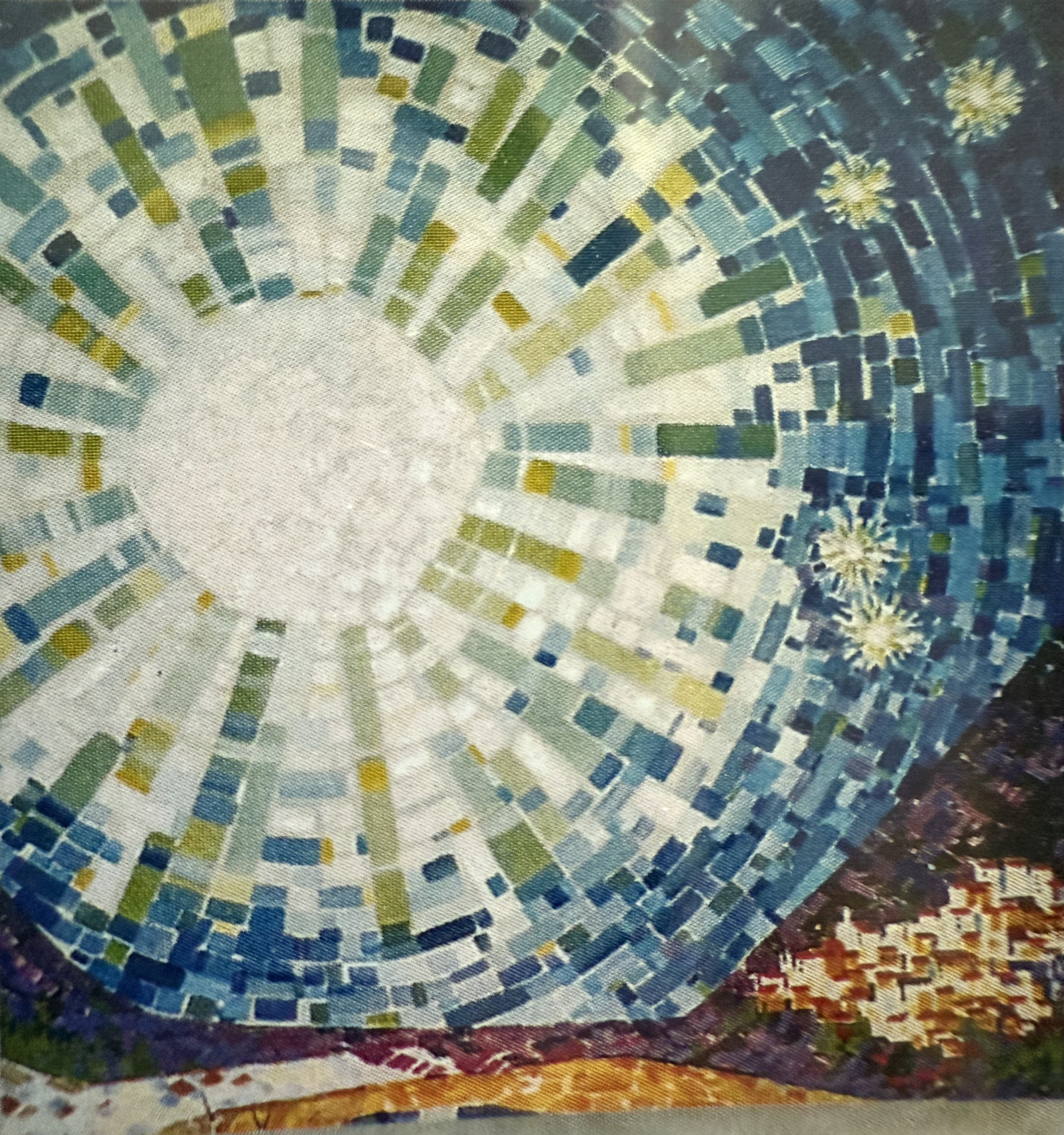
Mosaic designed by John Barthel for the Southwestern Life Building in Dallas, Texas.

- St. Pius X Catholic Parish, Dallas, Texas
- Glass mosaic installations for the Southwestern Life Building (1972), Dallas, Texas
