= Singer Building (Dallas) =

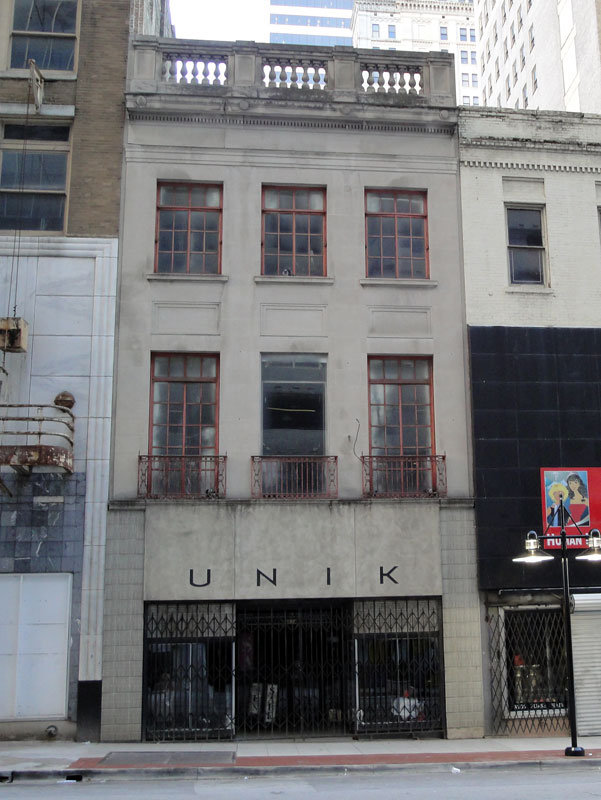
- Singer Building in 2010
- Interactive map of the Singer Building area

General information
- Status: Completed
- Type: Commercial
- Location: 1514 Elm Street; Dallas, Texas
- Coordinates: 32°46′52″N 96°47′57″W
- Completed: 1934

Technical details
- Floor count: 3 + Basement

Design and construction
- Architect: George Dahl

The Singer Building is a 3-story commercial structure located at 1514 Elm Street in the Main Street District in Downtown Dallas, Texas. The structure is one of a handful of original early commercial structures along Elm Street; many others were demolished and replaced by large office blocks during various building booms.

== History ==
Designed as the Southwest District Headquarters of the Singer Sewing Machine Company, the steel, concrete and Indiana limestone Singer building was designed by architect George Dahl and opened in 1934. The ground floor contained a sales room and hem-stitching room, offices were on the third floor and the basement served as a stock room. Classes were taught on the second level.

In 1948 Singer's regional offices vacated the building for a new headquarters in Oak Lawn, but Singer still used the building for sewing machine demonstrations.

The ground floor retail space changed hands throughout the years, but as of 2009 the building was mostly vacant. Because the structure lacks a fire escape or alley, the upper floors can no longer be occupied. This problem is common to adjacent historic structures and may be solved with the creation of a shared fire corridor.
