= Tschögl Building =

Residential building in Budapest, Hungary

Coordinates: 47.50588949378015°N 19.016884777765355°E

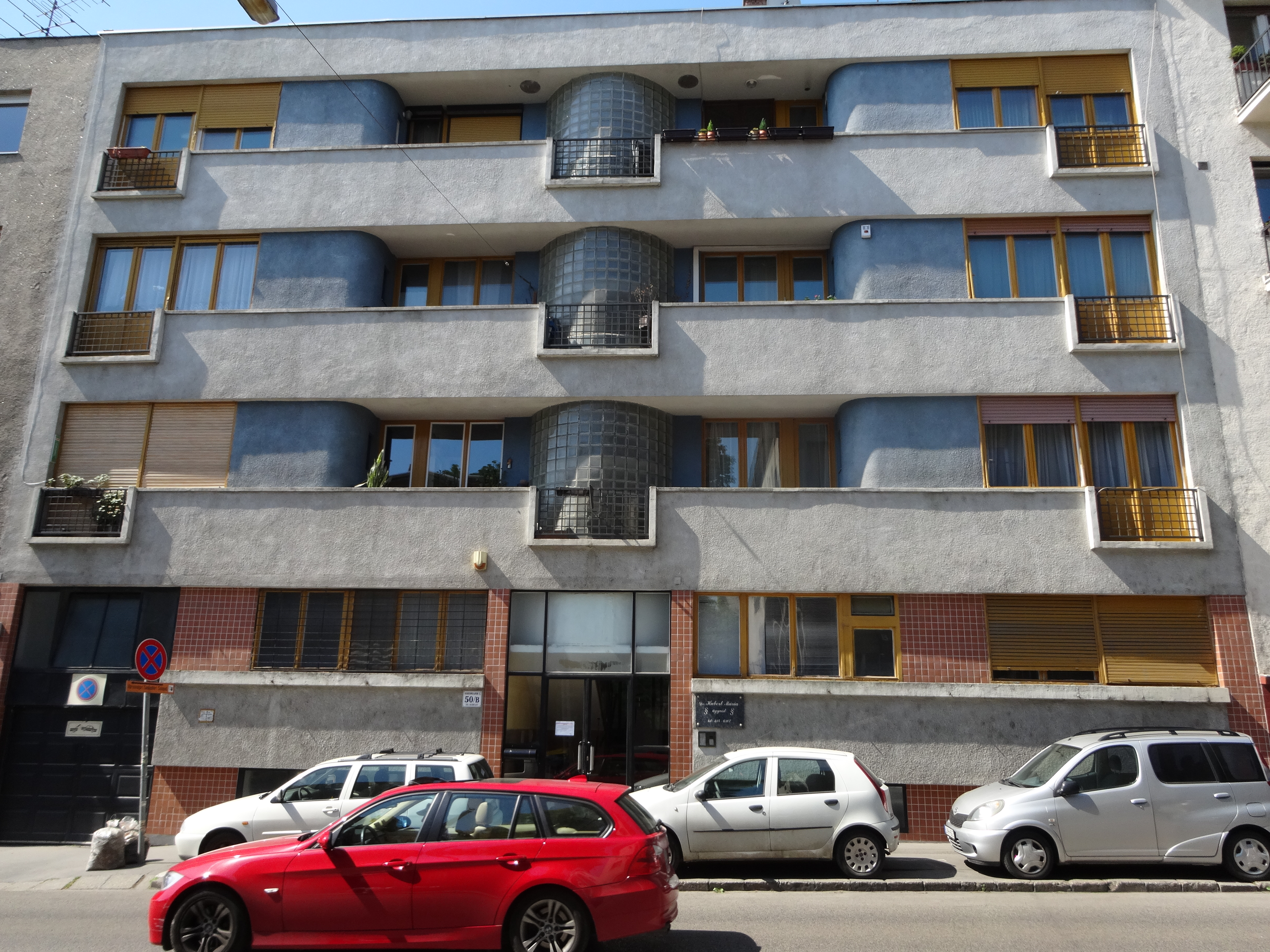
Tschogl building, Budapest 2015

The Tschögl building is an apartment building located at Varosmajor utca 50b, Budapest. The Hungarian architects Viktor and Aladar Olgyay designed the building in 1940 for Siklósi Tschögl Miklós (Nicholas W. Tschoegl) and his great-aunt, Tschögl Boriska. The building was one of the Olgyays' earliest commissions and incorporated a number of unusual and innovative features; it was still standing in 2015.

== The architects ==
Victor Olgyay and his identical twin brother Aladar promoted climate-responsive architecture. They fled Hungary in 1947, and re-established their architectural practice in the United States. There, in the 1950s, they formalized bioclimatic, i.e., passive solar, design as a discipline within the field of architecture.

== The building ==
The description here draws heavily on the description in Olgyay & Olgyay, and accompanying write-up by Giancarlo Palanti, which appeared first in Domus.

The Olgyays designed the building in 1940 or 1941. Although Hungary had joined the Axis powers in 1940, and Hungarian forces were fighting alongside the Germans in the invasion of Yugoslavia and the invasion of Russia in 1941, the war had not reached Hungary itself. The one concession to the war was the inclusion of an air-raid shelter in the basement of the building.

The Olgyays refer to the building as "A house reversed". The name reflects their decision to have the house face the hill and the trees of the garden behind it, rather than the street. All the 18 apartments in the building had their main room face on the garden. This insured that the rooms faced south, for light. Kitchens, maids' rooms, and the staircase face the street. The larger apartments on each side of each floor of the building have a window and small balcony facing the street, but the three one-room apartments face only the garden.

The "inward facing" concept was something that appealed to Tschögl Miklós, being congruent with his studies of Latin and his knowledge of ancient Roman house plans. He had a particular liking for the concept of a house closed off to the streets, with an atrium inside.

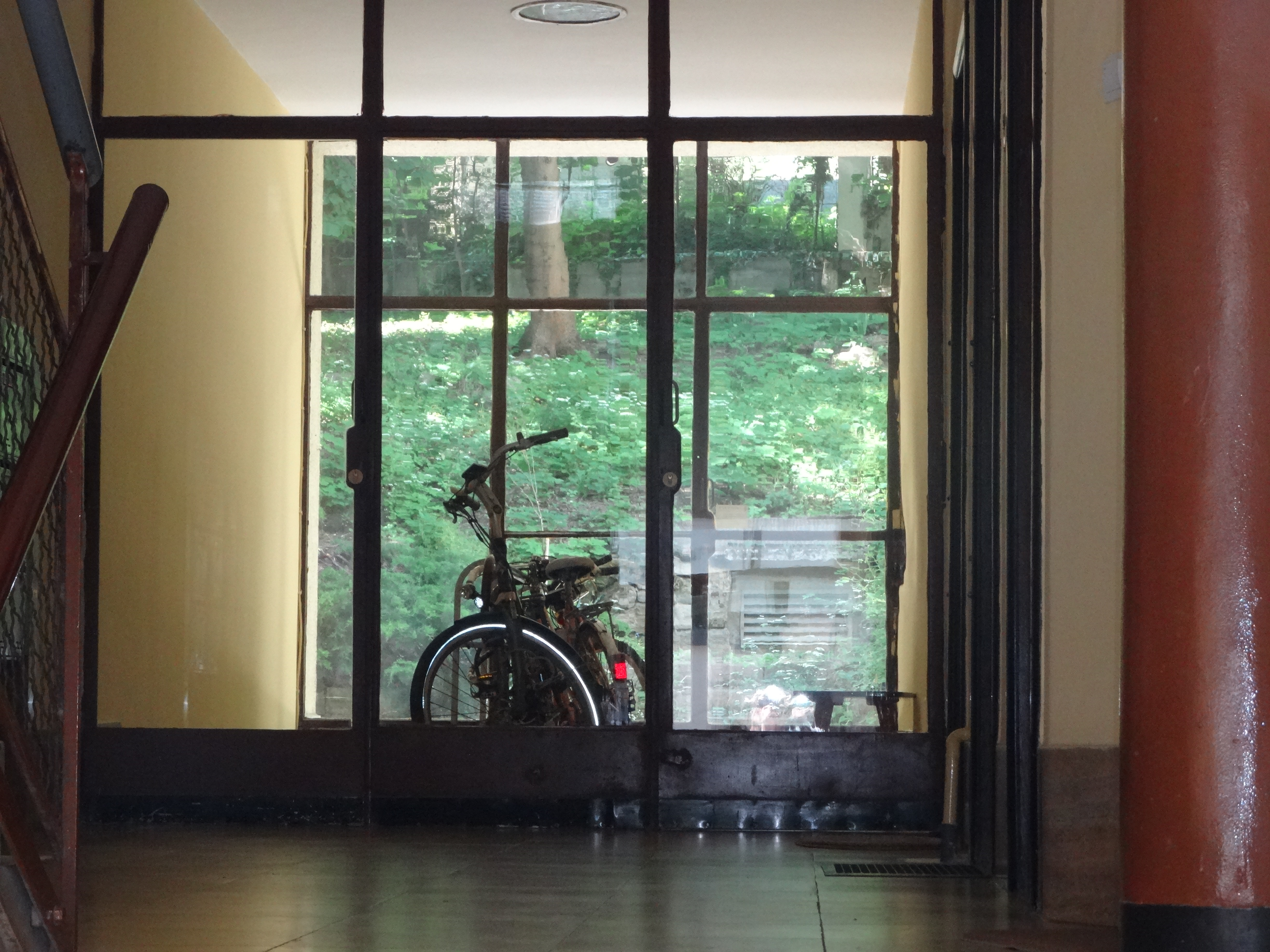
Tschogl building, Budapest, view through the front entrance through to the garden

In addition to the basement (Floor 0), which housed a laundry, the mechanicals, and the air-raid shelter, the building had four floors of apartments. The second, third, and fourth floors each had three one-room apartments and two three-room apartments, each of which had a bathroom and WC. By inference, the first floor had three apartments, and the entrance from the street through to the garden. One of the apartments on the first floor belonged to Tschögl Boriska, and it had a door directly to the garden.

The top floor had a roof terrace with a study, a partially covered verandah, a garden, and a shower. This was accessible via a private staircase from the apartment of Tschögl Miklós. During the siege of Budapest in 1944-5, shells hit the top of the building, rendering his apartment unusable. The roof terrace and its structures apparently were not replaced after the war.

The staircase was incorporated in a cylinder of glass blocks that let light into the hallway on each floor.

Another feature, unusual for the time, was that the building housed an underground garage. A tenant, arriving by car, could drive down a ramp that led through a tunnel to the garage, which was separate from the rest of the building, and which was under the garden. Someone arriving by car could park in the garage and then reach their apartment either by the staircase or by a lift that went from the basement to the fourth floor.

== The clients ==
At the time Tschögl Miklós was in his early 20s, and a director of the Tschögl family's firm, Hoffman József, a wholesaler of imported coffee, tea, spices, and the like. After the government closed the firm in 1948, he fled Hungary in 1948, with his wife and infant son and emigrated to Australia. From there the family emigrated to the United States in late 1960. Nicholas Tschoegl became a professor at the California Institute of Technology. He died in November 2011, in Pasadena, California, at the age of 93.

Tschögl Boriska (né Gaszner Boriska) was the widow of Tschögl Henrik (Heinrich Tschögl), and a former ballerina from the Hungarian opera. She continued to live in her apartment in the building and died there in March 1962, at the age of 95.
