= Emmett J. Conrad =

American physician

Emmett James Conrad (October 6, 1923 – April 24, 1993) was an American surgeon and Dallas civic leader. He was the first African-American member of both the Dallas Independent School District's board of trustees and the Texas State Board of Education.

== Early life and education ==
Emmett J. Conrad was born in Baton Rouge, Louisiana in 1923 to John and Flora Conrad. After graduating from high school and briefly beginning university studies at Southern University, Conrad was drafted into the United States Army. After serving in the army for a brief period of World War II, Conrad completed his undergraduate studies at Stanford University before enrolling in Meharry Medical College in Nashville, where he was awarded a Doctor of Medicine in 1948.

== Career ==
After graduating from medical school, Conrad completed a surgical residency at Homer Phillips Hospital in St. Louis, Missouri. In 1955, Conrad relocated to Dallas in order to practice at St. Paul's Hospital.

Prior to the year 1954, Black doctors in Dallas were not able to practice in or join the medical staffs of prominent Dallas hospitals. Black doctors were also excluded from the Texas Medical Association (TMA), which was the only professional organization recognized by the American Medical Association (AMA) in the state of Texas. St. Paul's Hospital was the first white hospital in Dallas to allow Black doctors hospital privileges and staff membership. Conrad became the first Black surgeon on the staff of St. Paul's Hospital in 1956, and would later become the hospital's Chief of Staff.

In addition to his career as a medical doctor, Conrad was an educational advocate and civic leader in Dallas. In 1967, Conrad became the first Black member of the Dallas Independent School District (DISD) Board of Trustees. Conrad also was on the Select Committee on Public Education and was appointed by Governor Mark White as the first Black member of the Texas State Board of Education.

During his 10-year tenure on the DISD Board of Trustees, Conrad worked towards initiatives such as the desegregation of school students and administration, the implementation of free lunch programming for low-income students, and the creation of Kindergarten programs in district. As a member of the Texas State Board of Education, Conrad also helped to pass controversial House Bill 72. Commonly known as "No Pass No Play," this policy mandates that students must be passing in all school courses in order to participate in extracurricular activities.

== Awards and honors ==
In 1993, the Dr. Emmett J. Conrad Leadership Program was established in order to provide the college students in Texas Senatorial District 23 an opportunity to participate in internships and community service that expand their leadership skills.

In 2006, Emmett J. Conrad High School was founded in Dallas, Texas in honor of Conrad.

== Personal life ==
Conrad married Eleanor Nelson on July 15, 1949. The couple had one child, Cecilia Conrad, who is the CEO for Lever for Change, as well as the managing director of the John D. and Catherine T. MacArthur Foundation. Emmett J. Conrad died on April 24, 1993, as a result of lung disease.
