= Emmett J. Conrad High School =

Location
- 7502 Fair Oaks Avenue; Dallas, Texas 75231; United States; 32.8766°N 96.7519°W

Information
- Type: Public, secondary
- School district: Dallas Independent School District
- Principal: Vivian Chandler Fairley
- Teaching staff: 90.71 (FTE)
- Grades: 9-12
- Enrollment: 1,275 (2023-2024)
- Student to teacher ratio: 14.06
- Colors: Royal blue and old gold
- Mascot: Charger
- Trustee dist.: 3, Dan Micciche
- Area: 4, Robin Ryan
- Website: www.dallasisd.org/conrad

Emmett J. Conrad High School is a public high school located in Vickery Meadow, Dallas, Texas. Emmett J. Conrad High School, which covers grades 9-12, is a part of the Dallas Independent School District. The school serves most of Vickery Meadow area and the DISD portion of Highland Meadows. It is named in honor of Dallas surgeon and civic leader Emmett James Conrad. In 2015, the school was rated "Met Standard" by the Texas Education Agency.

== History ==
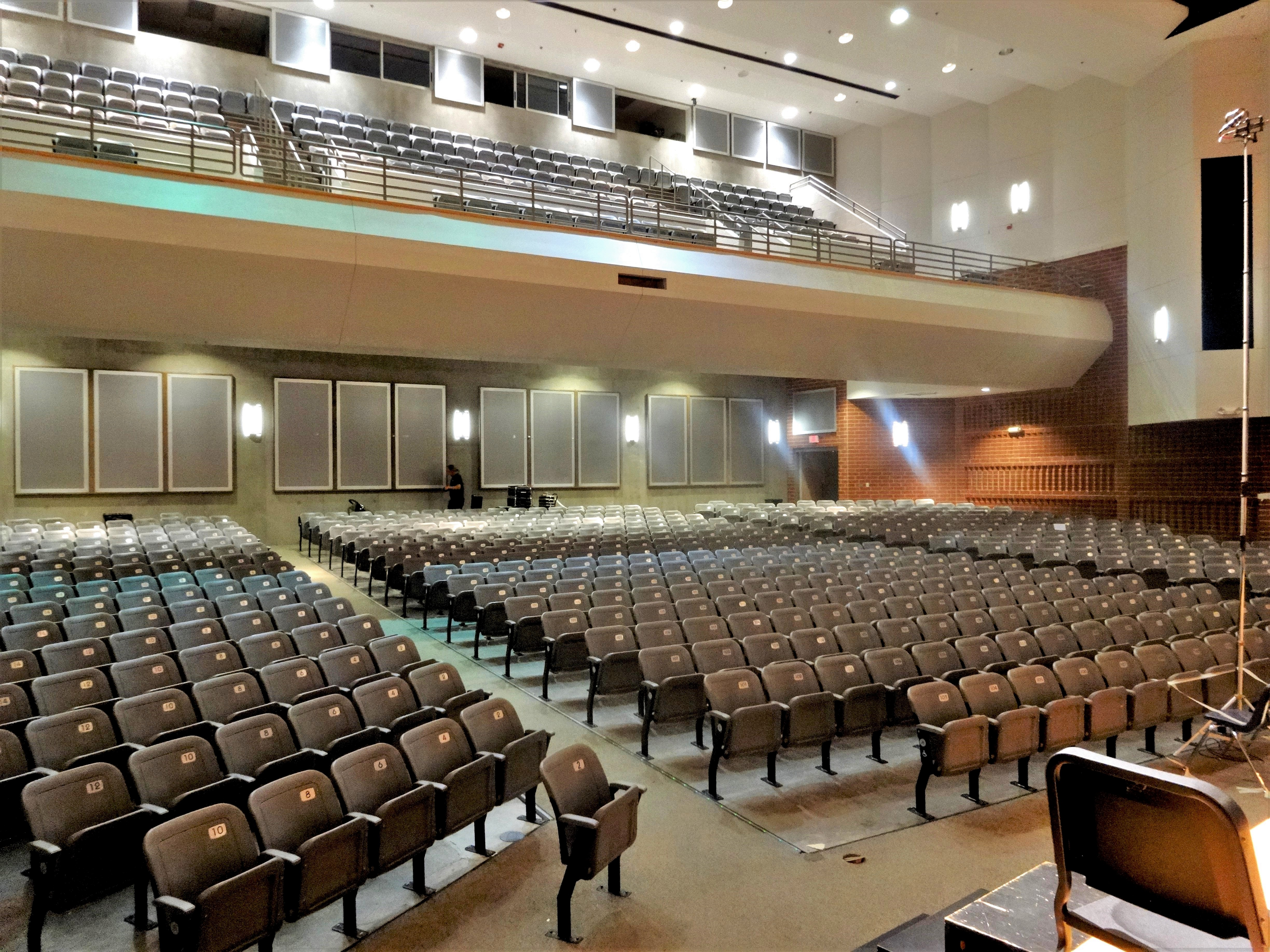
Inside the auditorium at Emmett J. Conrad High School in Dallas, TX.

The district projected that Conrad High School would have a higher enrollment. But by 2012 the enrollment was lower than expected as several area apartment complexes had been razed. In 2015, its student body was 66% of the school's official capacity.

== Features ==
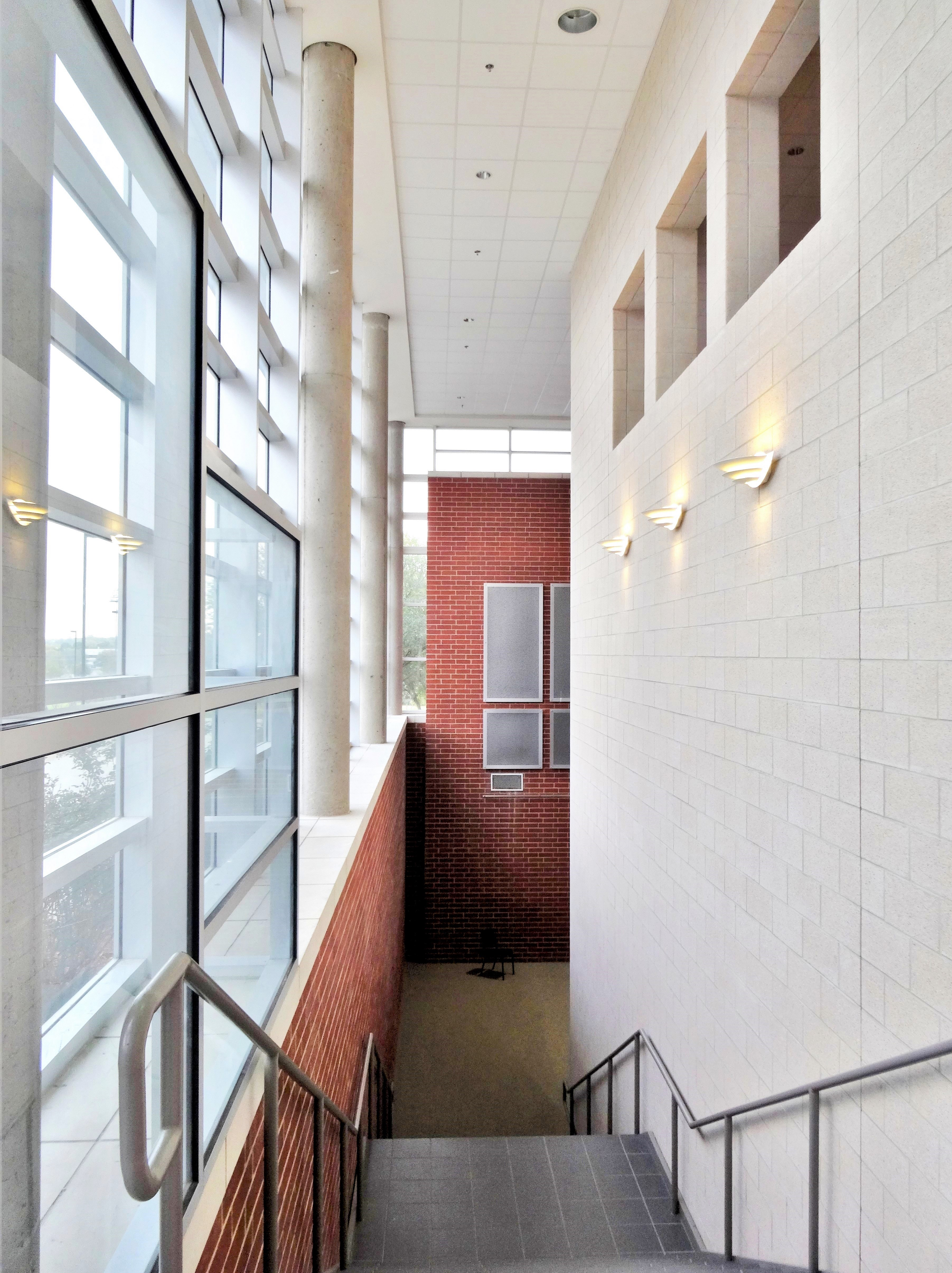
Stairs leading down to the auditorium lobby at Emmett J. Conrad High School in Dallas, TX.

Built in 2006 for $42.3 million, the school was designed to accommodate 2,000 students. The 325,000-square-foot (30,200 m^{2}) building features 46 core classrooms on 40 acres. It incorporates classrooms for performing arts, visual arts, media, science, and instructional technology. Additionally, the campus has student dining areas and athletic fields.

== Athletics ==
The Emmett J. Conrad Chargers compete in UIL district 11-5A in the following sports:

- Baseball
- Basketball
- Cross Country
- Football
- Golf
- Soccer
- Softball
- Swimming and Diving
- Tennis
- Track and Field
- Volleyball
- Wrestling

Conrad has competed in five UIL state tournaments (cross-country 2016 and 2017, wrestling 2014 and 2018, and track and field 2018).

Conrad now has the distinction of being the expense of Diamond Hill-Jarvis High School ending their 77-game losing streak, the 2nd longest in Texas High School Football history.

=== Swimming ===
Small in size by 5A standards, the Conrad swimming and diving team found some success starting in the 2016-2017 season. Previously coached by Joanna McDowell in 2017, the team earned 3rd place at District UIL competition and won at other various meets that season. After transitioning to 4A, the team has been under the direction of Coach Neil Grisham since 2024. The boys won the 2025 District Championship and came in third at the 4A Region 2 Championship.

== Robotics ==
Conrad has offered robotics programs to all students since 2009. The program is centered around FIRST Robotics Competition team FRC3005. The RoboChargers is a year round program which meets outside of school hours. The RoboChargers, founded in 2009, have won numerous awards in recent years, including their first "blue banner" event win at the Colorado Regional in 2018.

The RoboChargers have competed in the UIL State Robotics tournament since its initial year of creation in 2016. In 2023 the RoboChargers won the UIL Robotics State Champions, "claiming their place as not only the best in Texas but number five in the world" Competing in the FIRST (FRC) Division in 2016, 2017, 2018 and 2019 and winning runner-up in 2018 with partners FRC148 and FRC4639.

There are also four FIRST Tech Challenge teams, founded in 2017, that are part of the program.

The RoboCharger teams are supported and mentored by professionals from companies including Texas Instruments, Safeco, Boeing, and Exxon.

== Feeder patterns ==
As of the 2022-2023 school year, L. L. Hotchkiss, Jack Lowe Sr., Lee McShan Jr., Highland Meadows, and Jill Stone Elementary Schools feed into Tasby Middle School and then Conrad High School.
