= St. Pius X Catholic Church, Dallas =

Catholic church in Dallas

Coordinates: 32.8344°N 96.6661°W

St. Pius X Catholic Church
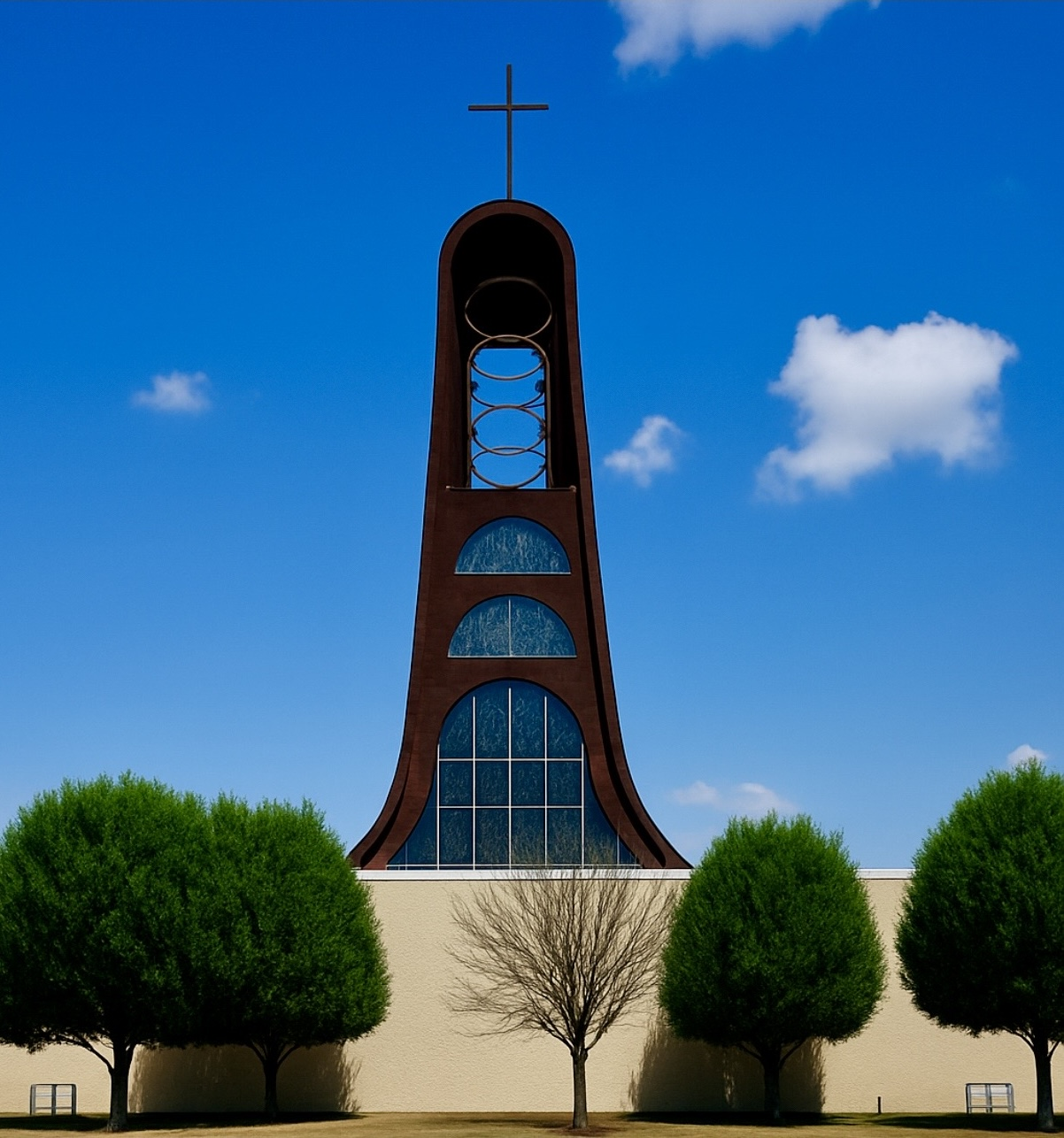
- Bell tower and modernist façade, completed in 1968
- St. Pius X Catholic Church
- Location: 3030 Gus Thomasson Road, Dallas, Texas, U.S.
- Country: United States
- Denomination: Roman Catholic
- Website: spxdallas.org

History
- Status: Parish church
- Founded: February 26, 1954
- Dedication: Pope St. Pius X

Architecture
- Functional status: Active
- Architect(s): John Barthel (lead), George Dahl (firm)
- Architectural type: Church
- Style: Mid-century modern with mission-style influence
- Completed: 1968

Specifications
- Materials: Brick, laminated wood

Administration
- Diocese: Roman Catholic Diocese of Dallas

Clergy
- Bishop: Edward J. Burns
- Pastor: Msgr. Larry Pichard

St. Pius X Catholic Church is a Roman Catholic parish located in East Dallas, Texas. Founded in 1954, it is part of the Roman Catholic Diocese of Dallas and serves the Lake Highlands and White Rock Lake communities. Designed by noted mid-century architects John Barthel in collaboration with George Dahl's firm, St. Pius X is recognized as a significant example of modern ecclesiastical architecture in Dallas, and its parish school has been cited in the Sixth Floor Museum’s Oral History Collection. The parish has supported local families through educational initiatives, intergenerational programs, and refugee resettlement assistance, including playing a key role in welcoming Vietnamese Catholic immigrants who later founded St. Peter Vietnamese Catholic Church nearby.

== History ==
St. Pius X Catholic Church was established on February 26, 1954, by Bishop Thomas K. Gorman of the Diocese of Dallas–Fort Worth to serve the growing Catholic population in the Casa View and Mesquite areas of northeast Dallas. The founding pastor, Rev. Msgr. Vincent Wolf, initially led the parish in temporary facilities before the construction of a permanent church and rectory.

By 1961, the parish had grown to approximately 1,100 families and became the first in the Diocese of Dallas to exceed its Diocesan Educational Fund campaign goal, contributing $172,000 toward new Catholic high schools. That same year, the parish built a new $58,994 classroom building to support its expanding K–8 school.

On September 3, 1963, the newly constructed church and rectory at 3030 Gus Thomasson Road were formally dedicated by Bishop Gorman. Approximately 3,000 parishioners and guests attended the ceremony, which included clergy, Papal honorees, 4th Degree Knights of Columbus, members of the diocesan choir, and Protestant ministers. Msgr. Wolf and former assistant pastors concelebrated the dedication Mass. The church’s design was inspired by Spanish colonial mission architecture and featured laminated wood beams and a spire rising 106 feet above the altar.

Construction of a new sanctuary began in 1966 under the direction of George Dahl’s architectural firm, with John Barthel serving as lead designer. Barthel is credited with shaping the sanctuary’s distinctive modern design, which reflects the clean lines and innovative forms characteristic of his later work. Dahl’s legacy includes major mid-century projects that shaped Dallas’ architectural landscape, and he is regarded as “one of the greatest and most well-known architects to have practiced in Dallas.” His enduring influence on civic and religious architecture was also recognized in the AIA Dallas retrospective, ‘‘The Maestro: George Dahl’s Enduring Legacy’’. The sanctuary was completed and opened for Mass in 1968.

In February 1979, the parish celebrated its 25th anniversary with a weekend of events involving the entire parish community.

The parish marked its 50th anniversary in 2004 with a year-long series of celebrations organized by a committee under pastor Msgr. Larry Pichard. Events included a jubilee Mass on February 21, a catered dinner, a photo history exhibit, and a special Mass in August led by Bishop Charles Grahmann. Former priests of the parish returned to celebrate weekend liturgies, and the festivities concluded with a multicultural festival in September showcasing the parish’s ethnic diversity through food, music, and historical displays.

== Architecture ==
The church’s architecture blends modernist design with influence from early Spanish colonial mission churches. The interior features sweeping laminated wood beams and an angular sanctuary form with a 90-foot bell tower topped by a 16-foot wooden cross. Three circular stained-glass windows symbolize the Holy Trinity, and round lighting fixtures evoke themes of eternity and permanence.

A marble Holy Family sculpture, designed in Pietrasanta, Italy, was installed in 1972. The hand-carved cross atop the tower, crafted in Münster, Texas, was installed after overcoming a crane mishap. The cornerstone was laid in May 1968 and includes time capsule mementos from parishioners.

== Parish life and community ==
St. Pius X Catholic School, founded shortly after the parish’s establishment, offers a K–8 education grounded in Catholic tradition. The school has expanded over the decades. Its curriculum blends academics, faith formation, and extracurricular activities.

The church sponsors a variety of parish ministries. Its Over 55 Club honors couples for long milestone anniversaries.
