= Victor Olgyay =

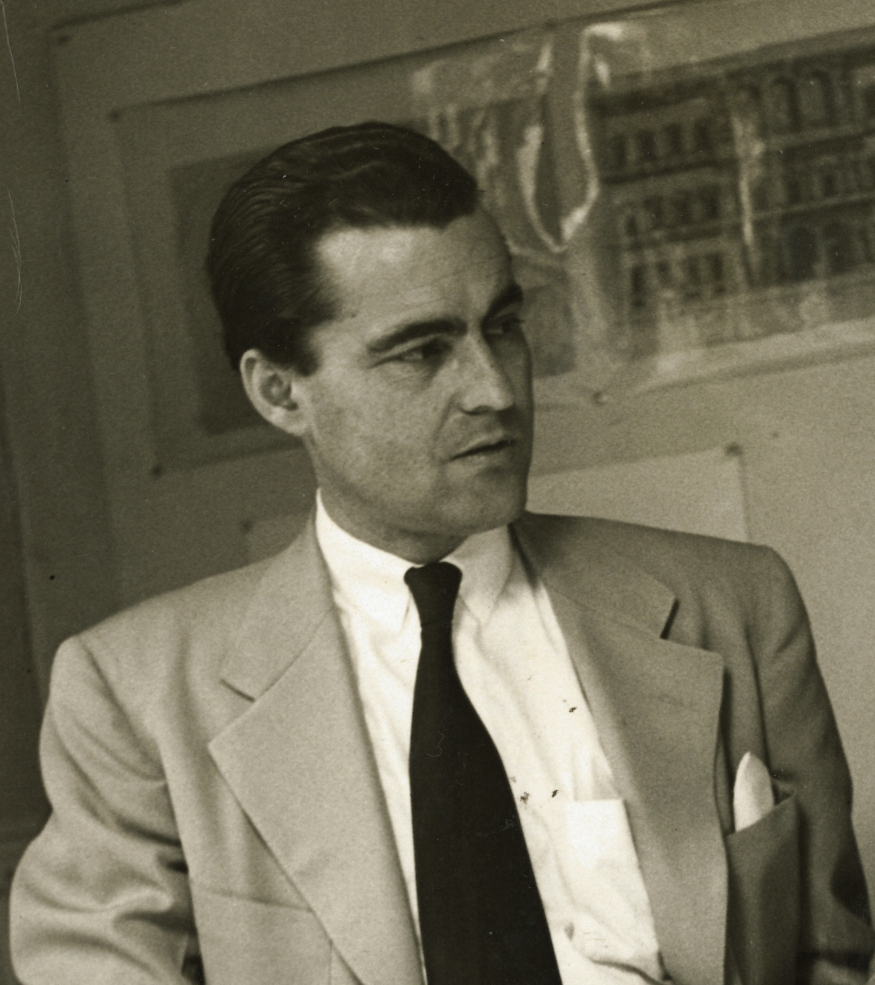
- Occupation: Architect
- Spouse: Ilona Csuvik
- Children: Nora, Cora and Victor Jr
- Practice: Bio-Climatic Architecture
- Buildings: Mud Wall

Victor Olgyay (September 1, 1910 – April 22, 1970) was an architect, city planner, and early researcher in the field of Bioclimatic design. He was an associate professor at the School of Architecture and Urban Planning of Princeton University until 1970 and, with his twin brother Aladar, a pioneer in the field of Bioclimatic design in the 1950's and 60's.

== Background ==
Olgyay studied English at the Royal Hungarian Institute of Technology in Budapest, before undertaking an architectural degree at the Scuola Superiore Di Architettura in Rome. In Hungary, he formed an architectural practice with Aladar, his identical twin. Victor moved to the United States in 1936, to undertake graduate study at Columbia University. The pair designed architectural works in Austria, Hungary and Turkey, returning to the United States in 1947. In addition to teaching at Notre Dame and MIT, they worked in their architectural practice Olgyay & Olgyay Architects until 1957, when Aladar died. Following Aladar's death, Victor designed approximately 20 buildings in Princeton, New Jersey. Victor Olgyay worked at Princeton University between 1953-1963.

Their first article was "The Temperate House" (1951), followed by other works on "Bioclimatic Approach to Architecture" and "To Pave to Bio-climatical Control and Orientation to Meet Requirements" (1954). More articles arose like "Sun orientation" and finally,"Environment and building shape" (1954). As of that moment the Olgyays became a huge reference to various new kind of architecture like solar Architecture, passive Architecture, bio-climatice Architecture. In 1963, with support from the National Science Foundation, the pair invented the thermoheliodon, a machine that enabled the testing of the effects of climate on buildings under laboratory conditions.

The energy crisis of the 1970's caused a significant economic damage to the developed world and greatly increased interest in the Olgyay brothers work.

Victor Olgyay died in 1970, aged 59.

== Architecture and climate ==
Design with Climate is a book where Victor Olgyay writes about the relationship between buildings and nature surrounds it. The book is separated into three parts concerning the climate and their relationship to human being, the interpretation of the effect on climate architectonic key and to its application in Architecture and Urbanism. Altogether "Architecture and Climate", develops into one complete theory of the architectonic design, supported by logical and theoretical justifications with coherent explanation of physical principles. Olgyay also relates methods and knowledge of other disciplines like Biology, Meteorology and Climatology, Engineering and Physics. These basic principles are applicable to any present project or recycling of an old building to help them adapt to its site and thus help reduce the environmental impact that it generates.

== Content of architecture and climate ==
The book is divided in three parts: Climatic Interpretation, Interpretation according to architectonic principles and Application.

Part 1: The "Climatic Interpretation" is a general introduction to a bio-climatic interpretation of climatic Elements. This first part is of great importance since it proposes his famous bio-climatic graph that is still in use today as a tool used by various bio-climatic architects world wide.

Part 2: The "Interpretation According to Architectonic Principles" goes on from Chapter 5 to 10 focuses on various Architectonic Principles. These consist of the selection of location, the solar control, the wind drifts, models of air flow and the thermal effects of the materials.

Part 3: The "Application" focus mainly on the application of architectonic principles on four regions, the temperate zone, the cold zone, the warm-barren zone and the warm humid zone.

== Architectural & Design Projects ==
- Hungarian Exhibit, New York World's Fair, 1939 (with Aladar Olgyay)
- Tschögl building, Budapest ("A house reversed") - Városmajor utca 50, Budapest.

== Books ==
- Olgyay, Aladar, & Olgyay, Victor. (1957). Solar control & shading devices. Princeton University Press.
- Olgyay, Victor. (1963) Design with Climate: Bioclimatic Approach to Architectural Regionalism. Princeton University Press, Princeton
