= George Dahl =

American architect

- Born: May 11, 1894; Minneapolis, Minnesota
- Died: July 18, 1987 (aged 93); Dallas, Texas
- Occupation: Architect
- Buildings: Titche-Goettinger Building, Hillcrest State Bank, The Dallas Morning News building, Southwestern Life building, LTV Aerospace Center, Dallas Public Library, Robert F. Kennedy Memorial Stadium
- Projects: Texas Centennial Exposition, University of Texas

George Leighton Dahl (May 11, 1894 – July 18, 1987) was a prominent American architect based in Dallas, Texas during the 20th century. His most notable contributions include the Art Deco structures of Fair Park while he oversaw planning and construction of the 1936 Texas Centennial Exposition. In 1970, in anticipation of imminent commercial growth brought on by the impending development of the Dallas/Fort Worth International Airport, he designed the First National Bank of Grapevine building at 1400 South Main Street. This iconic cubist structure served as a harbinger of the area's upcoming economic development.

== Background ==
George Dahl was born in Minneapolis to Norwegian immigrant parents, Olaf G. and Laura (Olson) Dahl. He received a B.Arch. from the University of Minnesota and a M.Arch. from Harvard University in 1923. He subsequently spent two years in Italy as a fellow at the American Academy in Rome.

== Career ==
In 1926, he began work for the Herbert M. Greene Co. in Dallas, Texas. He became a partner in Greene's firm in 1928, and the name of the firm was changed to Herbert M. Greene, LaRoche, and Dahl (later LaRoche and Dahl).

In 1943, Dahl founded his own firm, George Leighton Dahl, Architects and Engineers, Incorporated, with a nationwide practice. Dahl was also a pioneer in fast-track construction. Upon his retirement in 1973, he had produced some 3,000 projects throughout the country that are estimated to be worth $2 billion.

== Personal life ==
Dahl was married twice: in 1921 to Lillie E. Olson, with whom he had one daughter, and in 1978 to Joan Renfro. Dahl died of dehydration at the age of ninety-three at his home in Dallas.

== Significant work ==
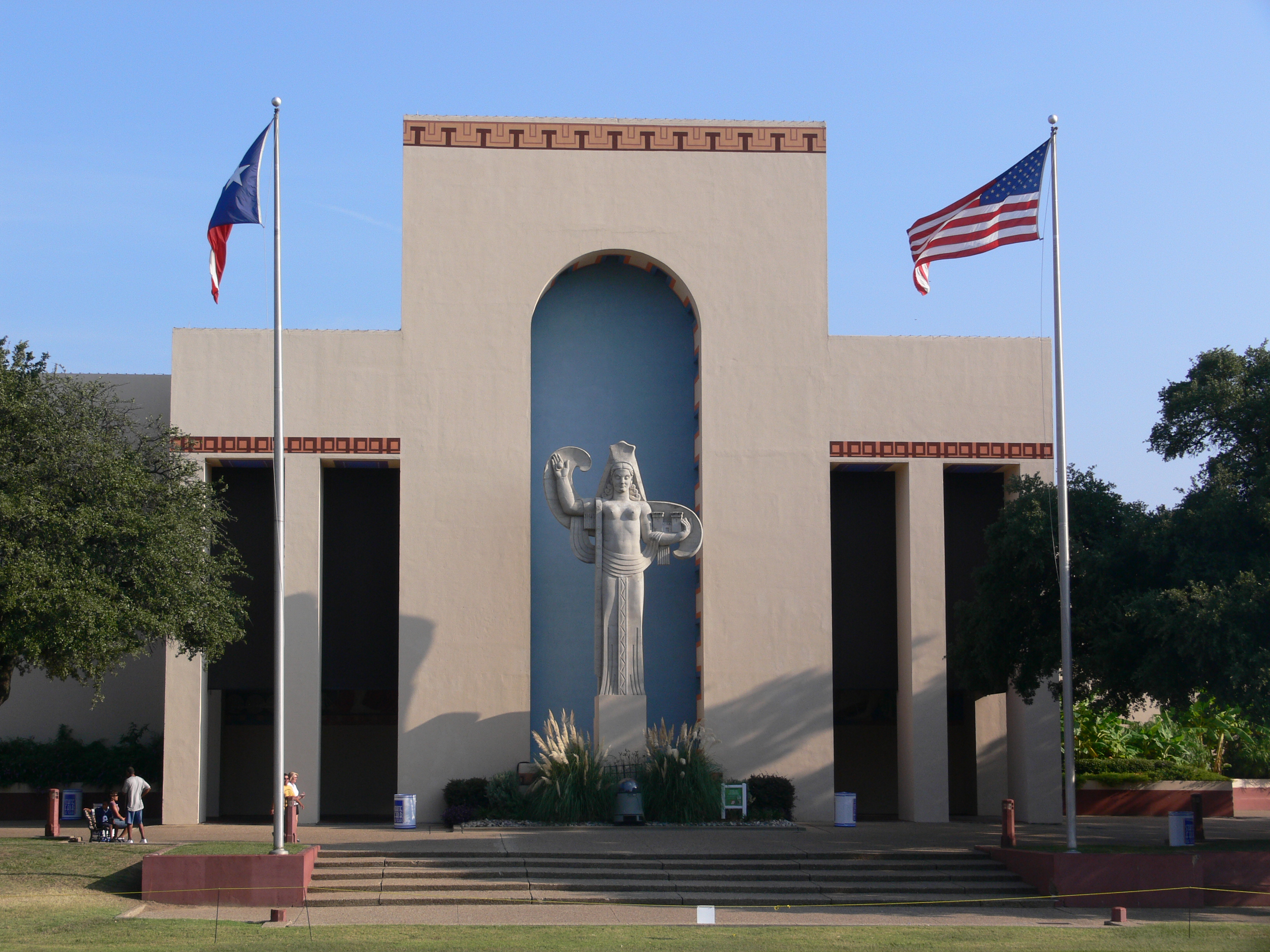
Art Deco buildings in Fair Park

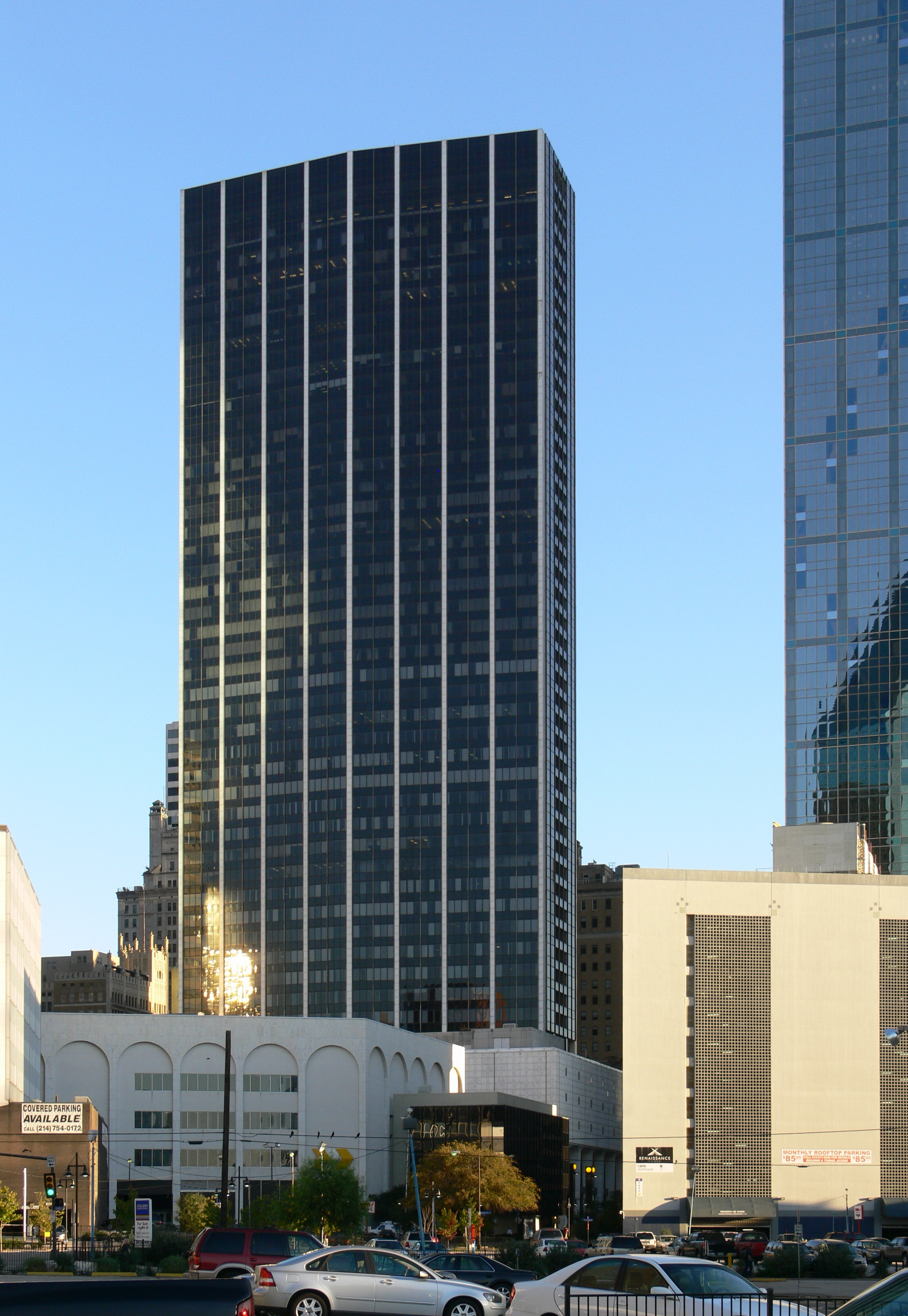
First National Bank Tower (Elm Place)

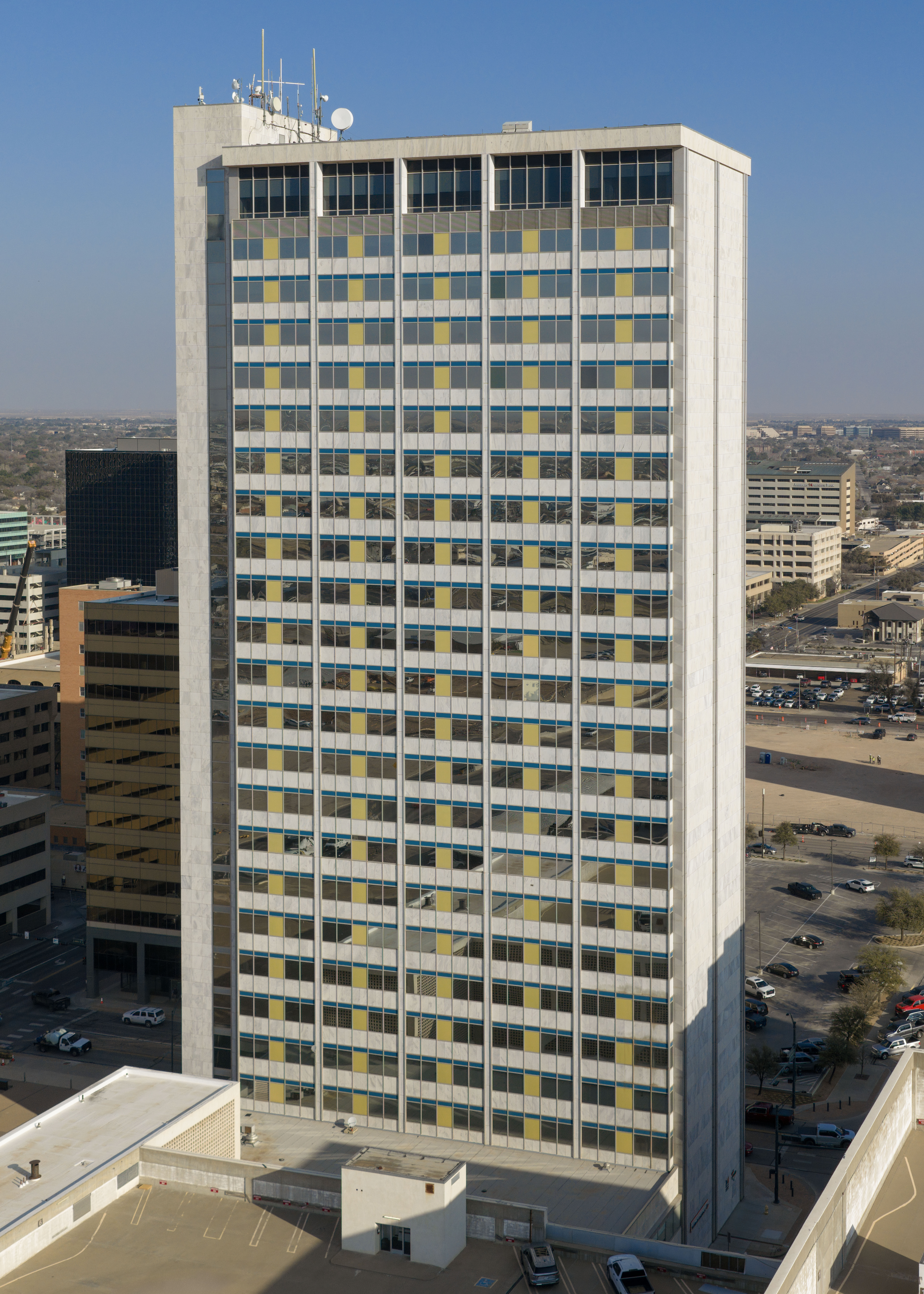
303 W. Wall St., Midland, TX; formerly the First National Bank Building, still tallest building in Midland, TX in 2018

Dallas Projects:

Year Completed	Building	Address	Notes
1927	Neiman Marcus Building	1618 Main Street
1929	Titche-Goettinger Building	1900 Elm Street
1930	Volk Brothers Building
1934	Singer Building (Dallas, Texas)	1514 Elm
1936	Tower Building	Fair Park
1936	Esplanade of State	Fair Park
1936	Cotton Bowl	Fair Park
1938, 1972	Hillcrest State Bank		First drive-through bank
1947	Mayfair Department Store	141 Elm Street
1948	American Poster & Printing Building	1600 S Akard Street
1949	Remington Rand Building	2100 N Akard Street
1949	Dallas Morning News Building	508 Young Street
1949	Merchants State Bank	Ross/Henderson
1949	Philipson's Fashions	Elm/St Paul
1950	Employers Insurance Building
1950	Great American Reserve Insurance Building	2020 Live Oak Street
1951	Park Cities YMCA	6000 Preston Road
1953	Mrs. Baird's Bakery	Central Expressway/Mockingbird
1955	Old Dallas Central Library	1954 Commerce Street
1956	Congregation Shearith Israel
1957	Dallas Federal Savings and Loan	1505 Elm Street
1957	Dallas Memorial Auditorium
1962	The Whittle Music Building	2733 Oak Lawn Avenue
1964	Southwestern Life Building	Ross/Akard
1964	Northway Baptist Church Sanctuary	3877 Walnut Hill Lane
1965	Owen Fine Art Center	Southern Methodist University
1965	First National Bank Tower	1401 Elm Street
1968	St. Pius X Catholic Church (Dallas, Texas)	3030 Gus Thomasson Road	Mid-century modern sanctuary combining mission-inspired detailing and laminated wood construction
1969	Turtle Creek Village	Oak Lawn/Blackburn
1970	LTV Aerospace	Grand Prairie
1970	First National Bank of Grapevine	1400 South Main Street, Grapevine
1971	Earle Cabell Federal Building

Other projects:

- First National Bank Building, 303 W. Wall St., Midland, TX, 1952
- Tanglewood Resort, Lake Texoma, 1960
- DC Stadium, later renamed to RFK Stadium, Washington, D.C., 1962
- Medical facilities for: Dallas Methodist Hospital, Dallas Public Health Center
- Central Library for The University of Texas at Arlington
- Texas Hall for The University of Texas at Arlington
- Education facilities for: University of Texas, University of North Texas, East Texas State College, University of Plano, Southern Methodist University, Jesuit High School
- Prisons for the Texas Department of Corrections
- Retail stores for Sears, Roebuck and Co.
