= Ju-Nel Homes =

Mid-century modern home builder in Dallas, Texas, US

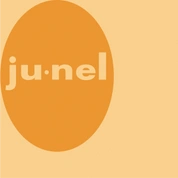
- Type: Private
- Industry: Architecture; residential construction
- Founded: 1959
- Founders: Lyle Rowley, Jack Wilson
- Defunct: 1981
- Headquarters: Dallas, Texas, United States
- Area served: Dallas, Texas
- Products: Custom homes, Mid-century modern residences
- Website: ju-nel.com

Ju-Nel Homes was a homebuilding firm based in Dallas, Texas that specialized in mid-century modern residential design. The firm was founded in 1959 by architects Lyle Rowley and Jack Wilson, who focused on custom homes that incorporated natural materials and emphasized connections to the surrounding landscape.

== History ==
Rowley and Wilson were both former apprentices of Texas modernist architect Howard Meyer. They named their company by combining the names of their wives, Julie Rowley and Nelda Wilson. Ju-Nel Homes built approximately 147 houses in Dallas, concentrated in neighborhoods including Eastwood Estates, Casa Linda, Lake Highlands, and areas near White Rock Lake.

Their designs often incorporated wooded or sloped lots, with homes positioned to preserve existing trees and natural features. Rowley retired in 1967, and Wilson continued operating the firm until 1981.

== Notable projects ==
- 10457 Vinemont Street, Eastwood Estates – An A-frame home built around 1962–63, retaining original beams, brickwork, and large glass openings. The house was featured by *The Dallas Morning News* when it was listed for sale in 2025.
- 11521 Lochwood Boulevard – A 1964 house with a cantilevered deck, vaulted ceilings, clerestory windows, and brick floors. It has been included in preservation tours and local media coverage.
- 10444 Silverock Drive, Eastwood Estates – Built around 1960, designed to integrate with mature trees on the site.
- 11123 Flamingo Lane, Lake Highlands – Features include clerestory windows, sloped ceilings, and a two-sided fireplace. The home has been documented by preservation advocates.

== Reception and legacy ==
Ju-Nel Homes attracted clients from the Dallas creative community, including advertising executive Stan Richards, founder of The Richards Group, and conductor Walter Hendl.

The firm's houses have appeared on local home tours and in preservation efforts related to mid-century modern architecture in Dallas. Research by local historians and preservation advocates has identified and documented over 140 Ju-Nel homes as of 2024.

A residence built by Ju-Nel received an award from the Dallas chapter of the American Institute of Architects in 2025.

== Influence ==
Architecture sources have drawn comparisons between Ju-Nel Homes and the work of California developer Joseph Eichler, particularly in their use of glass walls, low-pitched roofs, and indoor-outdoor living spaces.

Preservation groups, including Docomomo US/North Texas, have highlighted Ju-Nel's role in Dallas' mid-century modern movement.

== See also ==
- Mid-century modern
- Joseph Eichler
- Modern architecture in the United States
